= PCM (disambiguation) =

PCM or pulse-code modulation is a digital representation of an analog signal.

PCM may also refer to:

== Computing ==
- Performance Counter Monitor, Intel's technology for monitoring performance levels of CPUs
- Personal Computer Magazine, a Dutch computer magazine
- Phase-change memory, a type of non-volatile computer memory
- Plug-compatible machine, module, mainframe, or manufacturer – a piece of computer hardware designed to be operationally compatible with systems made by a different manufacturer, or a manufacture thereof
- Process control monitoring, in computing, a procedure follower to obtain detailed information about the process use
- Parity-check matrix, used for error correction

== Science and technology ==
- Perchloromethane, a solvent
- Perchloromethyl mercaptan, a synthetic intermediate
- Phase-change material, a chemical substance with a high heat of fusion
- Phase conjugate mirror, a type of mirror, that conjugates the phase of the light while reflecting it
- Photochemical machining, a process for machining thin materials with chemicals and UV light
- Phylogenetic comparative methods, a method for historical relationships of lineages (phylogenies) to test evolutionary hypotheses in biology
- Polarizable continuum model, used to model solvent in physical chemistry computation
- Powertrain control module, an on-board vehicle computer designed to minimize its emissions and increase fuel economy
- Principal chiral model, a quantum field theory which is integrable in two dimensions
- Protection circuit module, used in battery packs

== Organizations ==
- Paralympic Council of Malaysia, the National Paralympic Committee of Malaysia
- Partido Comunista Mexicano (Mexican Communist Party), a former communist political party in Mexico
- Partidul Civic Maghiar (Hungarian Civic Party), an ethnic Hungarian political party in Romania
- Pacific Cyber/Metrix, a defunct American computer company
- PCM, Inc., a U.S. computer retailing company
- PCM Uitgevers, a Dutch publishing company
- Private Capital Management, a Florida-based wealth-management firm co-founded by Bruce Sherman
- Pop Culture Media, a Tennessee-based entertainment company owned by Savage Ventures that operates ComicBook.com

== Other ==
- pcm, the ISO language code for Nigerian pidgin
- Per calendar month, an abbreviation used in legal agreements
- Per cent mille (pcm), one one-thousandth of a percent
- Pomona College Magazine, alumni magazine of Pomona College
- Pro Cycling Manager, a cycling game by Cyanide Studios
- Project cycle management, the process of planning and managing projects, programmes and organisations
- Process Communication Model, a non-clinical personality assessment, communication and management methodology in the work of Taibi Kahler
- Psychological continuum model, a framework to classify sport and event consumers, in order of their psychological connection towards the object
- Paracoccidioidomycosis, an acute to chronic fungal infection
- r/PoliticalCompassMemes, a subreddit dedicated towards memes relating to the Political Compass test
