= IBM 1720 =

The IBM 1720 was a pilot project to create a real-time process control computer based on the IBM 1620 Model I.

Only three 1720 systems were ever built: one for the Amoco oil refinery in Whiting, Indiana; one for the Socal oil refinery in El Segundo, California; and one for E. I. du Pont in Wilmington, Delaware. All were installed in 1961. The Amoco and Socal systems ran for many years.

The 1720 led to the IBM 1710 Process Control systems that IBM introduced in March 1961; these were cheaper and less elaborate than the 1720.

== See also ==
- IBM 1710
- IBM 1800
