= Computer console =

Computer console may refer to:

- Computer terminal
- Front panel, display and switches on early computers
- System console, a text entry and display device for system administration messages
- Video game console, a device specially made for video game play
