= IBM 1710 =

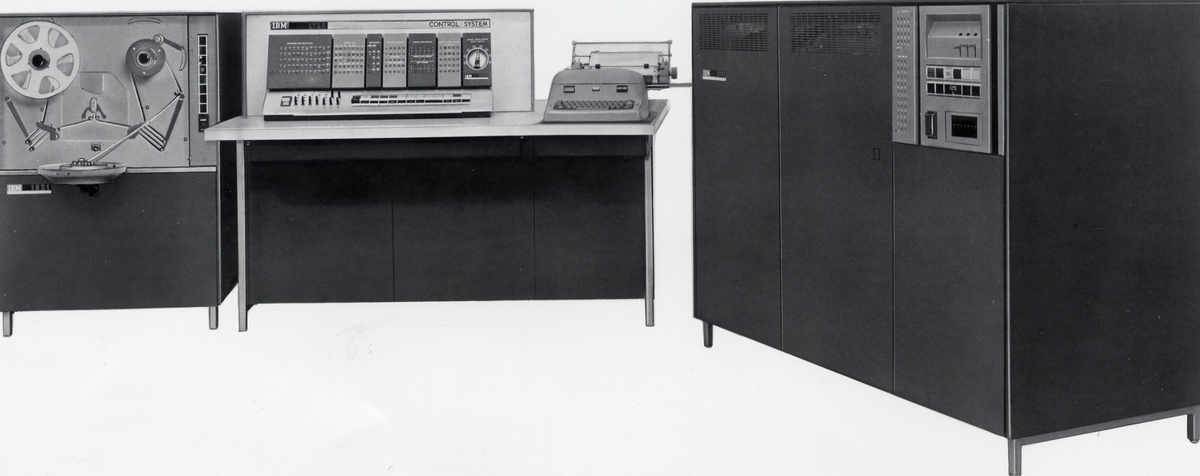
IBM 1710 Control System - Open-loop system showing IBM 1711 data converter, Model 1. IBM 1620 and 1621 units R-6033

The IBM 1710 was a process control system that IBM introduced in March 1961. It used either a 1620 I or a 1620 II Computer and specialized I/O devices (e.g., IBM 1711 analog-to-digital converter and digital-to-analog converter, IBM 1712 discrete I/O and analog multiplexer, factory floor operator control panels).

The IBM 1620 used in the 1710 system was modified in several ways, the most obvious was the addition of a very primitive hardware interrupt mechanism.

The 1710 was used by paper mills, oil refineries and electric companies.

== See also ==
- IBM 1720
- IBM 1800
