= IBM 1712 =

The IBM 1712 Multiplexer and Terminal Unit is part of the IBM 1710 process control computer. The Terminal Unit provides the physical connections between factory wiring and the computer. The 1712 can support up to 300 separate wire pairs. Signal types supported include analog input, analog output, contact sense, contact operate, process branch indicators and process interrupts. Special terminal blocks support thermocouple inputs. The Multiplexer selects which signal is connected to the IBM 1711 Data Converter.
