= IBM 1711 =

Analog input-output subsystem of the IBM 1710 process control system

The IBM 1711 Data Converter was part of the IBM 1710 process control computer. The 1711 contained an analog-to-digital converter that accepted signals from the IBM 1712 Multiplexer and Terminal Unit that were between -50 millivolts and +50 millivolts and converted them into signed, four decimal digit numbers that were stored in the 1710s core memory.

The 1711 featured a real-time clock that could place the current hour and minute into storage, again as a 4 digit number. On the 1711's control panel, there was a bank of seven decimal digit manual entry switches that could be read by the computer. The 1711 also contained address circuitry for the IBM 1712 Multiplexer.

Optional 1711 features included contact sense, contact operate, analog output, interrupt, and process branch indicators.

While all this and more would fit comfortably on a single IC today, the IBM 1711 occupied a three section rack cabinet.

== Operations ==
The IBM 1711 Data Converter was a component of the IBM 1710 process control system. It worked with the IBM 1712 Multiplexer and Terminal Unit to receive analog signals from industrial instruments. Its analog-to-digital converter transformed these signals into digital values that the computer could process and store. The 1711 also included a real-time clock and a terminal address selector for selecting input signals.

== Features ==
The 1711 included an analog-to-digital converter, a real-time clock, a terminal address selector, and an operator's panel. The analog-to-digital converter required approximately 50 milliseconds per conversion, allowing up to 20 conversions per second. Depending on the system configuration, additional features included contact sensing, contact operation, analog output, interrupts, and process branch indicators.

== See also ==
- IBM 1800
