= Gain scheduling =

Approach to control of non-linear systems

In control theory, gain scheduling is an approach to control of nonlinear systems that uses a family of linear controllers, each of which provides satisfactory control for a different operating point of the system.

One or more observable variables, called the scheduling variables, are used to determine what operating region the system is currently in and to enable the appropriate linear controller. For example, in an aircraft flight control system, the altitude and Mach number might be the scheduling variables, with different linear controller parameters available (and automatically plugged into the controller) for various combinations of these two variables. In brief, gain scheduling is a control design approach that constructs a nonlinear controller for a nonlinear plant by patching together a collection of linear controllers.

A relatively large scope state of the art about gain scheduling has been published in (Survey of Gain-Scheduling Analysis & Design, D.J.Leith, WE.Leithead).

Recently, new methodologies using Machine learning, such as Adaptive control based on Artificial Neural Networks (ANN) and Reinforcement Learning, have been studied.

== See also ==
- Linear parameter-varying control
