= IBM 610 =

Vacuum tube computer system

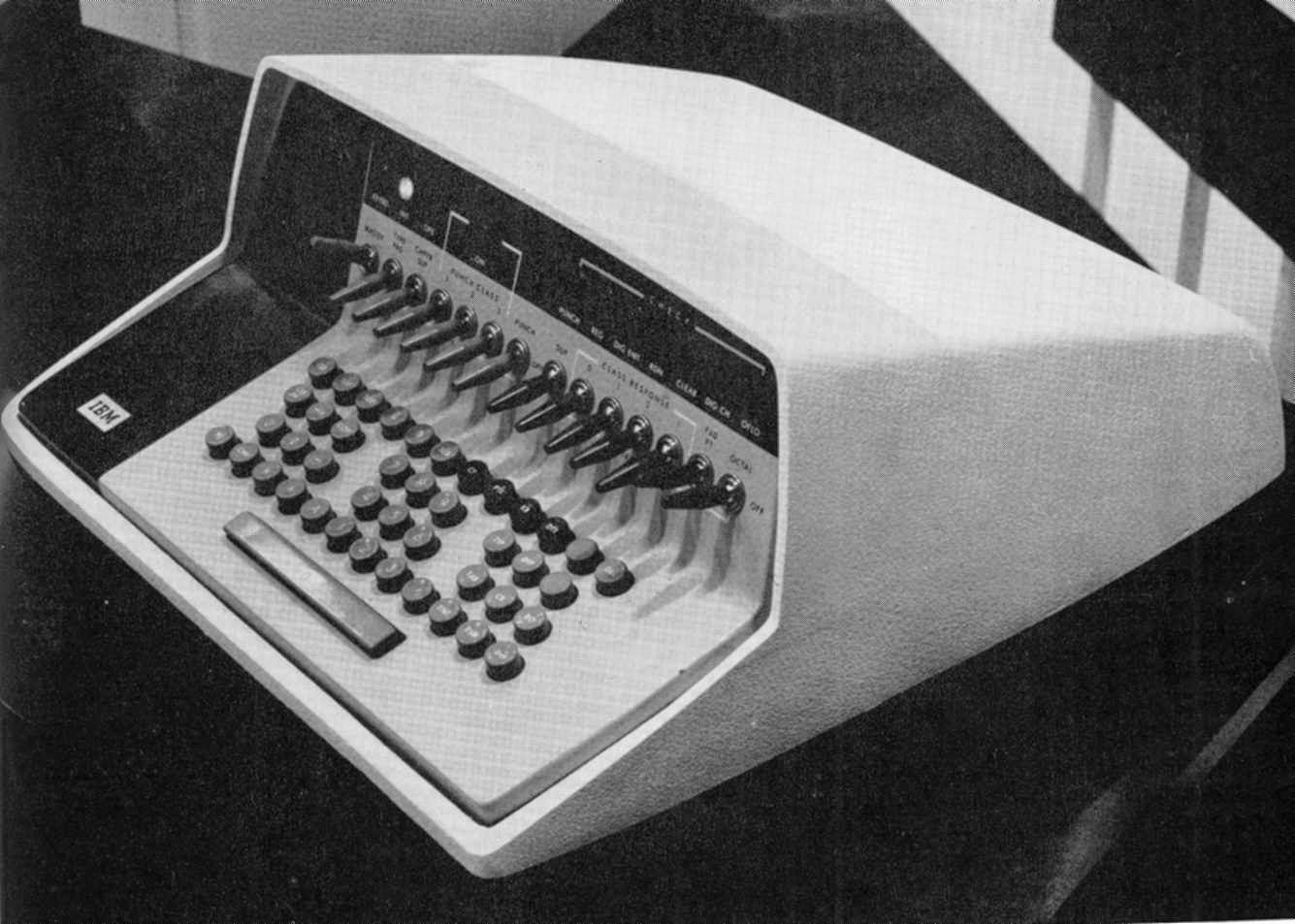
- Control unit of the IBM 610 with keyboard
- Also known as: IBM 610 Auto-Point Computer
- Developer: John Lentz, as part of his work for the Watson Lab at Columbia University
- Manufacturer: IBM
- Type: Personal computer
- Released: 1957; 69 years ago
- Introductory price: $55,000 (or rented for $1150 per month ($460 academic))
- Units shipped: 180
- Removable storage: Punched paper tape
- Weight: 800 pounds (360 kg)
- Successor: IBM 1620

The IBM 610 Auto-Point Computer is one of the first personal computers, in the sense of a computer to be used by one person whose previous experience with computing might only have been with desk calculators. It was controlled interactively by a keyboard. The principal designer of this machine was John Lentz, as part of his work for the Watson Lab at Columbia University.

The IBM 610 was introduced in 1957. It was small enough to easily fit in an office; it weighed about 800 pounds (360 kg). It was designed to be used in a normal office, without any special electrical or air conditioning requirements. It used vacuum tubes, a magnetic drum, and punched paper tape readers and punchers. The input was from a keyboard and output was to an IBM electric typewriter, at eighteen characters per second. It was one of the first computers to be controlled from a keyboard. The term "auto-point" referred to the ability to automatically adjust the decimal point in floating-point arithmetic.

Its price was $55,000, or it could be rented for $1150 per month ($460 academic). IBM made 180 units. It was a slow and limited computer, and was generally replaced by the IBM 1620.

== See also ==
- List of vacuum-tube computers
