= Psychological continuum model =

The psychological continuum model (PCM) is a framework to organise prior literature from various academic disciplines to explain sport and event consumer behaviour. The framework suggests four stages—awareness, attraction, attachment and allegiance—to describe how sport and event involvement progressively develops with corresponding behaviours (e.g., playing, watching, buying). The PCM uses a vertical framework to characterise various psychological connections that individuals form with objects to explain the role of attitude formation and change that directs behaviours across a variety of consumption activities. Explaining the how and why of sport and event consumer behaviour, it discusses how personal, psychological and environmental factors influence a wide range of sport consumption activities.

== Framework ==
Please click the box to enlarge

The figure shows the four stages of the PCM - awareness, attraction, attachment and allegiance. On each stage, there is a horizontal decision making process. Inputs (green arrows) influence the internal processing (blue boxes) that creates outputs (yellow arrows). The outcomes are shown in the four different stages of the PCM (grey boxes). The unique decision making process is based upon the level of involvement of the consumer towards a sport/team/event. The following sequence is shown in each stage:

Inputs → Internal Processing ↔ Output

The PCM framework states that, through the processing of internal and external inputs, individuals progress upward along the four psychological connection stages. The overall evaluation of an object at a specific stage is the product of the processing of personal, psychological and environmental factors.

== Stages ==
=== Awareness ===
Example
- John's Awareness. John’s introduction to road cycling occurred at the age of 15 through a key socialising agent, his uncle Jack. Jack bought John his first bike, which he rode to school every day. When John was 15 and saw the Tour the France on television, he was amazed by the event. When Jack gave John one of his old road bikes and took him cycling on the weekend, John's progression to the Attraction stage began.

Awareness stands for the notion when an individual first learns that a certain sport, event or team exists. In this stage the individual has not formed a preference or favourite. The PCM suggests that awareness of sport, teams and events stems from formal and informal channels, for examples parents, friends, school and media. In most cases awareness begins during childhood, but can also derive from other socializing agents. The value placed on the specific sport and event from a societal perspective is important in the awareness stage. The examples of I know about football and I know about Arsenal FC illustrate the awareness stage box.

=== Attraction ===
Example
- John's Attraction. John began to realize that cycling provided him a number of positive outcomes. He was able to meet other cyclists, make new friends and spend time with his uncle. He received pleasure from riding outside and the thrill of riding down hills at fast speed. His self-esteem rose by getting into shape and being one of the fastest riders among his friends. He also enjoyed the break from his daily routine when riding the bike.

In the attraction stage, the individual has a favourite sport, event, team or leisure hobby. Attraction is based upon a number of extrinsic and intrinsic motives. In other words, the sport, event, or leisure hobby provides the opportunity to satisfy needs and receive benefits. The motives stem from a combination of personal, psychological and environmental factors. The Attraction processing creates outcomes of positive affect and intentions, as well as engaging in consumption behaviour related to the sport and event. The examples of I like football and I like Arsenal FC illustrate the attraction stage box.

=== Attachment ===
Example
- John's Attachment. John progresses into the attachment stage relatively quickly and within a year begins riding every Saturday and Sunday morning. Cycling now is an important part in his life. He often wears cycling clothes to class, spent time visiting bike shops and uses the Internet to follow international cycling events. He even joins a cycling club and travels to regional cycling competitions with his friends who are predominantly cyclists.

In the attachment stage the benefits and the sport object are internalised taking on a collective emotional, functional, and symbolic meaning. The psychological connection towards a sport, event, team or leisure hobby strengthens. Internal processes become more important and the influence of socializing agents decreases. Examples for the attachment stage are I am a football player or I am an Arsenal Fan.

=== Allegiance ===
Example
- John's Allegiance. John progressed into the allegiance stage during his last year of college as the strength of his connection to cycling became durable. He thought of cycling and related activities daily. He always found time to ride and follow the sport regardless of university and work requirements or other sport opportunities. John’s psychological connection to cycling has strengthened and is now guiding his behaviour.

As the attachment processing continues, the internal collective meaning becomes more durable in terms of persistence and resistance and has greater impact on activities and behaviour. This is noted by the examples of I live for football and I live for Arsenal FC within the allegiance stage.

== See also ==
- Diffusion of innovations
- Transtheoretical model
