= Process control monitoring =

In the application of integrated circuits, process control monitoring (PCM) is the procedure followed to obtain detailed information about the process used.

PCM is associated with designing and fabricating special structures that can monitor technology specific parameters such as V_{th} in CMOS and V_{be} in bipolars. These structures are placed across the wafer at specific locations along with the chip produced so that a closer look into the process variation is possible.
