= Linear parameter-varying control =

Regulation of nonlinear systems

Linear parameter-varying control (LPV control) deals with the control of linear parameter-varying systems, a class of nonlinear systems which can be modelled as parametrized linear systems whose parameters change with their state.

== Gain scheduling ==
In designing feedback controllers for dynamical systems a variety of modern, multivariable controllers are used. In general, these controllers are often designed at various operating points using linearized models of the system dynamics and are scheduled as a function of a parameter or parameters for operation at intermediate conditions. It is an approach for the control of non-linear systems that uses a family of linear controllers, each of which provides satisfactory control for a different operating point of the system. One or more observable variables, called the scheduling variables, are used to determine the current operating region of the system and to enable the appropriate linear controller. For example, in case of aircraft control, a set of controllers are designed at different gridded locations of corresponding parameters such as AoA, Mach, dynamic pressure, CG etc. In brief, gain scheduling is a control design approach that constructs a nonlinear controller for a nonlinear plant by patching together a collection of linear controllers. These linear controllers are blended in real-time via switching or interpolation.

Scheduling multivariable controllers can be a very tedious and time-consuming task. A new paradigm is the linear parameter-varying (LPV) techniques which synthesize of automatically scheduled multivariable controller.

=== Drawbacks of classical gain scheduling ===
- An important drawback of classical gain scheduling approach is that adequate performance and in some cases even stability is not guaranteed at operating conditions other than the design points.
- Scheduling multivariable controllers is often a tedious and time-consuming task and it holds true especially in the field of aerospace control where the parameter dependency of controllers are large due to increased operating envelopes with more demanding performance requirements.
- It is also important that the selected scheduling variables reflect changes in plant dynamics as operating conditions change. It is possible in gain scheduling to incorporate linear robust control methodologies into nonlinear control design; however the global stability, robustness and performance properties are not addressed explicitly in the design process.

Though the approach is simple and the computational burden of linearization scheduling approaches is often much less than for other nonlinear design approaches, its inherent drawbacks sometimes outweigh its advantages and necessitate a new paradigm for the control of dynamical systems. New methodologies such as Adaptive control based on Artificial Neural Networks (ANN), Fuzzy logic, Reinforcement Learning, etc. try to address such problems, the lack of proof of stability and performance of such approaches over entire operating parameter regime requires design of a parameter dependent controller with guaranteed properties for which, a Linear Parameter Varying controller could be an ideal candidate.

== Linear parameter-varying systems ==
LPV systems are a very special class of nonlinear systems which appears to be well suited for control of dynamical systems with parameter variations. In general, LPV techniques provide a systematic design procedure for gain-scheduled multivariable controllers. This methodology allows performance, robustness and bandwidth limitations to be incorporated into a unified framework. A brief introduction on the LPV systems and the explanation of terminologies are given below.

=== Parameter dependent systems ===
In control engineering, a state-space representation is a mathematical model of a physical system as a set of input, $u$ output, $y$ and state variables, $x$ related by first-order differential equations. The dynamic evolution of a nonlinear, non-autonomous system is represented by

$$\dot{x} = f(x,u,t)$$

If the system is time variant

$$\dot{x} = f(x(t),u(t),t),x(t_0)$$
$$x(t_0)=x_0 ,u(t_0)=u_0$$

The state variables describe the mathematical "state" of a dynamical system and in modeling large complex nonlinear systems if such state variables are chosen to be compact for the sake of practicality and simplicity, then parts of dynamic evolution of system are missing. The state space description will involve other variables called exogenous variables whose evolution is not understood or is too complicated to be modeled but affect the state variables evolution in a known manner and are measurable in real-time using sensors. When a large number of sensors are used, some of these sensors measure outputs in the system theoretic sense as known, explicit nonlinear functions of the modeled states and time, while other sensors are accurate estimates of the exogenous variables. Hence, the model will be a time varying, nonlinear system, with the future time variation unknown, but measured by the sensors in real-time. In this case, if $w(t),w$ denotes the exogenous variable vector, and $x(t)$ denotes the modeled state, then the state equations are written as

$$\dot{x} =f(x(t),w(t),\dot{w}(t),u(t))$$

The parameter $w$ is not known but its evolution is measured in real time and used for control. If the above equation of parameter dependent system is linear in time then it is called Linear Parameter Dependent systems. They are written similar to Linear Time Invariant form albeit the inclusion in time variant parameter.

$$\dot{x}=A(w(t))x(t)+B(w(t))u(t)$$
$$y=C(w(t))x(t)+D(w(t))u(t)$$

Parameter-dependent systems are linear systems, whose state-space descriptions are known functions of time-varying parameters. The time variation of each of the parameters is not known in advance, but is assumed to be measurable in real time. The controller is restricted to be a linear system, whose state-space entries depend causally on the parameter’s history. There exist three different methodologies to design a LPV controller namely,

1. Linear fractional transformations which relies on the small gain theorem for bounds on performance and robustness.
2. Single Quadratic Lyapunov Function (SQLF)
3. Parameter Dependent Quadratic Lyapunov Function (PDQLF) to bound the achievable level of performance.

These problems are solved by reformulating the control design into finite-dimensional, convex feasibility problems which can be solved exactly, and infinite-dimensional convex feasibility problems which can be solved approximately. This formulation constitutes a type of gain scheduling problem and contrast to classical gain scheduling, this approach address the effect of parameter variations with assured stability and performance.
