= Thermodynamic equilibrium =

State of thermodynamic systems where no net flow of matter or energy occurs

Thermodynamic equilibrium is a notion of thermodynamics with axiomatic status referring to an internal state of a single thermodynamic system, or a relation between several thermodynamic systems connected by more or less permeable or impermeable walls.

In thermodynamic equilibrium, there are no net macroscopic flows of mass nor of energy within a system or between systems. In a system that is in its own state of internal thermodynamic equilibrium, not only is there an absence of macroscopic change, but there is an "absence of any tendency toward change on a macroscopic scale." Systems in mutual thermodynamic equilibrium are simultaneously in mutual thermal, mechanical, chemical, and radiative equilibria. Systems can be in one kind of mutual equilibrium, while not in others. In thermodynamic equilibrium, all kinds of equilibrium hold at once and indefinitely, unless disturbed by a thermodynamic operation. In a macroscopic equilibrium, perfectly or almost perfectly balanced microscopic exchanges occur; this is the physical explanation of the notion of macroscopic equilibrium.

A thermodynamic system in a state of internal thermodynamic equilibrium has a spatially uniform temperature. Its intensive properties, other than temperature, may be driven to spatial inhomogeneity by an unchanging long-range force field imposed on it by its surroundings.

In systems that are at a state of non-equilibrium there are, by contrast, net flows of matter or energy. If such changes can be triggered to occur in a system in which they are not already occurring, the system is said to be in a "meta-stable equilibrium".

Though not a widely named "law," it is an axiom of thermodynamics that there exist states of thermodynamic equilibrium. The second law of thermodynamics states that, in an isolated system, when partitions are removed between equilibrated subsystems in different states, the system spontaneously equilibrates (achieves thermodynamic equilibrium), accompanied by an increase in the system's entropy.

== Overview ==
Classical thermodynamics deals with states of dynamic equilibrium. The state of a system at thermodynamic equilibrium is the one for which some thermodynamic potential is minimized (in the absence of an applied voltage), or for which the entropy (S) is maximized, for specified conditions. One such potential is the Helmholtz free energy (A), for a closed system at constant volume and temperature (controlled by a heat bath):

$$A = U - TS$$

Another potential, the Gibbs free energy (G), is minimized at thermodynamic equilibrium in a closed system at constant temperature and pressure, both controlled by the surroundings:

$$G = U - TS + PV$$

where T denotes the absolute thermodynamic temperature, P the pressure, S the entropy, V the volume, and U the internal energy of the system. In other words, $\Delta G = 0$ is a necessary condition for chemical equilibrium under these conditions (in the absence of an applied voltage).

Thermodynamic equilibrium is the unique stable stationary state that is approached or eventually reached as the system interacts with its surroundings over a long time. The above-mentioned potentials are mathematically constructed to be the thermodynamic quantities that are minimized under the particular conditions in the specified surroundings.

== Conditions ==
- For a completely isolated system, S is maximum at thermodynamic equilibrium.
- For a closed system at controlled constant temperature and volume, A is minimum at thermodynamic equilibrium.
- For a closed system at controlled constant temperature and pressure without an applied voltage, G is minimum at thermodynamic equilibrium.

The various types of equilibriums are achieved as follows:

- Two systems are in thermal equilibrium when their temperatures are the same.
- Two systems are in mechanical equilibrium when their pressures are the same.
- Two systems are in diffusive equilibrium when their chemical potentials are the same.
- All forces are balanced and there is no significant external driving force.

== Relation of exchange equilibrium between systems ==
Often the surroundings of a thermodynamic system may also be regarded as another thermodynamic system. In this view, one may consider the system and its surroundings as two systems in mutual contact, with long-range forces also linking them. The enclosure of the system is the surface of contiguity or boundary between the two systems. In the thermodynamic formalism, that surface is regarded as having specific properties of permeability. For example, the surface of contiguity may be supposed to be permeable only to heat, allowing energy to transfer only as heat. Then the two systems are said to be in thermal equilibrium when the long-range forces are unchanging in time and the transfer of energy as heat between them has slowed and eventually stopped permanently; this is an example of a contact equilibrium. Other kinds of contact equilibrium are defined by other kinds of specific permeability. When two systems are in contact equilibrium with respect to a particular kind of permeability, they have common values of the intensive variable that belongs to that particular kind of permeability. Examples of such intensive variables are temperature, pressure, chemical potential.

A contact equilibrium may be regarded also as an exchange equilibrium. There is a zero balance of rate of transfer of some quantity between the two systems in contact equilibrium. For example, for a wall permeable only to heat, the rates of diffusion of internal energy as heat between the two systems are equal and opposite. An adiabatic wall between the two systems is 'permeable' only to energy transferred as work; at mechanical equilibrium the rates of transfer of energy as work between them are equal and opposite. If the wall is a simple wall, then the rates of transfer of volume across it are also equal and opposite; and the pressures on either side of it are equal. If the adiabatic wall is more complicated, with a sort of leverage, having an area-ratio, then the pressures of the two systems in exchange equilibrium are in the inverse ratio of the volume exchange ratio; this keeps the zero balance of rates of transfer as work.

A radiative exchange can occur between two otherwise separate systems. Radiative exchange equilibrium prevails when the two systems have the same temperature.

== Thermodynamic state of internal equilibrium of a system ==
A collection of matter may be entirely isolated from its surroundings. If it has been left undisturbed for an indefinitely long time, classical thermodynamics postulates that it is in a state in which no changes occur within it, and there are no flows within it. This is a thermodynamic state of internal equilibrium. (This postulate is sometimes, but not often, called the "minus first" law of thermodynamics. One textbook calls it the "zeroth law", remarking that the authors think this more befitting that title than its more customary definition, which apparently was suggested by Fowler.)

Such states are a principal concern in what is known as classical or equilibrium thermodynamics, for they are the only states of the system that are regarded as well defined in that subject. A system in contact equilibrium with another system can by a thermodynamic operation be isolated, and upon the event of isolation, no change occurs in it. A system in a relation of contact equilibrium with another system may thus also be regarded as being in its own state of internal thermodynamic equilibrium.

== Multiple contact equilibrium ==
The thermodynamic formalism allows that a system may have contact with several other systems at once, which may or may not also have mutual contact, the contacts having respectively different permeabilities. If these systems are all jointly isolated from the rest of the world those of them that are in contact then reach respective contact equilibria with one another.

If several systems are free of adiabatic walls between each other, but are jointly isolated from the rest of the world, then they reach a state of multiple contact equilibrium, and they have a common temperature, a total internal energy, and a total entropy. Amongst intensive variables, this is a unique property of temperature. It holds even in the presence of long-range forces. (That is, there is no "force" that can maintain temperature discrepancies.) For example, in a system in thermodynamic equilibrium in a vertical gravitational field, the pressure on the top wall is less than that on the bottom wall, but the temperature is the same everywhere.

A thermodynamic operation may occur as an event restricted to the walls that are within the surroundings, directly affecting neither the walls of contact of the system of interest with its surroundings, nor its interior, and occurring within a definitely limited time. For example, an immovable adiabatic wall may be placed or removed within the surroundings. Consequent upon such an operation restricted to the surroundings, the system may be for a time driven away from its own initial internal state of thermodynamic equilibrium. Then, according to the second law of thermodynamics, the whole undergoes changes and eventually reaches a new and final equilibrium with the surroundings. Following Planck, this consequent train of events is called a natural thermodynamic process. It is allowed in equilibrium thermodynamics just because the initial and final states are of thermodynamic equilibrium, even though during the process there is transient departure from thermodynamic equilibrium, when neither the system nor its surroundings are in well defined states of internal equilibrium. A natural process proceeds at a finite rate for the main part of its course. It is thereby radically different from a fictive quasi-static 'process' that proceeds infinitely slowly throughout its course, and is fictively 'reversible'. Classical thermodynamics allows that even though a process may take a very long time to settle to thermodynamic equilibrium, if the main part of its course is at a finite rate, then it is considered to be natural, and to be subject to the second law of thermodynamics, and thereby irreversible. Engineered machines and artificial devices and manipulations are permitted within the surroundings. The allowance of such operations and devices in the surroundings but not in the system is the reason why Kelvin in one of his statements of the second law of thermodynamics spoke of "inanimate" agency; a system in thermodynamic equilibrium is inanimate.

Otherwise, a thermodynamic operation may directly affect a wall of the system.

It is often convenient to suppose that some of the surrounding subsystems are so much larger than the system that the process can affect the intensive variables only of the surrounding subsystems, and they are then called reservoirs for relevant intensive variables.

== Local and global equilibrium ==
It can be useful to distinguish between global and local thermodynamic equilibrium. In thermodynamics, exchanges within a system and between the system and the outside are controlled by intensive parameters. As an example, temperature controls heat exchanges. Global thermodynamic equilibrium (GTE) means that those intensive parameters are homogeneous throughout the whole system, while local thermodynamic equilibrium (LTE) means that those intensive parameters are varying in space and time, but are varying so slowly that, for any point, one can assume thermodynamic equilibrium in some neighborhood about that point.

If the description of the system requires variations in the intensive parameters that are too large, the very assumptions upon which the definitions of these intensive parameters are based will break down, and the system will be in neither global nor local equilibrium. For example, it takes a certain number of collisions for a particle to equilibrate to its surroundings. If the average distance it has moved during these collisions removes it from the neighborhood it is equilibrating to, it will never equilibrate, and there will be no LTE. Temperature is, by definition, proportional to the average internal energy of an equilibrated neighborhood. Since there is no equilibrated neighborhood, the concept of temperature doesn't hold, and the temperature becomes undefined.

This local equilibrium may apply only to a certain subset of particles in the system. For example, LTE is usually applied only to massive particles. In a radiating gas, the photons being emitted and absorbed by the gas do not need to be in a thermodynamic equilibrium with each other or with the massive particles of the gas for LTE to exist. In some cases, it is not considered necessary for free electrons to be in equilibrium with the much more massive atoms or molecules for LTE to exist.

As an example, LTE will exist in a glass of water that contains a melting ice cube. The temperature inside the glass can be defined at any point, but it is colder near the ice cube than far away from it. If energies of the molecules located near a given point are observed, they will be distributed according to the Maxwell–Boltzmann distribution for a certain temperature. If the energies of the molecules located near another point are observed, they will be distributed according to the Maxwell–Boltzmann distribution for another temperature.

Local thermodynamic equilibrium does not require either local or global stationarity. In other words, each small locality need not have a constant temperature. However, it does require that each small locality change slowly enough to practically sustain its local Maxwell–Boltzmann distribution of molecular velocities. A global non-equilibrium state can be stably stationary only if it is maintained by exchanges between the system and the outside. For example, a globally-stable stationary state could be maintained inside the glass of water by continuously adding finely powdered ice into it to compensate for the melting, and continuously draining off the meltwater. Natural transport phenomena may lead a system from local to global thermodynamic equilibrium. Going back to our example, the diffusion of heat will lead our glass of water toward global thermodynamic equilibrium, a state in which the temperature of the glass is completely homogeneous.

== Reservations ==
Some accounts of thermodynamic equilibrium often enough make provisos or reservations to their statements. Some writers leave such reservations merely implied or more or less unstated.

For example, H. B. Callen writes in this context: "In actuality, few systems are in absolute and true equilibrium." He refers to radioactive processes and remarks that they may take "cosmic times to complete, [and] generally can be ignored". He adds "In practice, the criterion for equilibrium is circular. Operationally, a system is in an equilibrium state if its properties are consistently described by thermodynamic theory!"

J.A. Beattie and I. Oppenheim write: "Insistence on a strict interpretation of the definition of equilibrium would rule out the application of thermodynamics to practically all states of real systems."

A.B. Pippard writes in The Elements of Classical Thermodynamics: "Given long enough a supercooled vapour will eventually condense, ... . The time involved may be so enormous, however, perhaps 10^{100} years or more, ... . For most purposes, provided the rapid change is not artificially stimulated, the systems may be regarded as being in equilibrium."

Another author, A. Münster, writes in this context. He observes that thermonuclear processes often occur so slowly that they can be ignored in thermodynamics. He comments: "The concept 'absolute equilibrium' or 'equilibrium with respect to all imaginable processes', has therefore, no physical significance." He therefore states that: "... we can consider an equilibrium only with respect to specified processes and defined experimental conditions."

According to L. Tisza: "... in the discussion of phenomena near absolute zero. The absolute predictions of the classical theory become particularly vague because the occurrence of frozen-in nonequilibrium states is very common."

== Definitions ==
The most general kind of thermodynamic equilibrium of a system is through contact with the surroundings that allows simultaneous passages of all chemical substances and all kinds of energy. A system in thermodynamic equilibrium may move with uniform acceleration through space but must not change its shape or size while doing so; thus it is defined by a rigid volume in space. It may lie within external fields of force, determined by external factors of far greater extent than the system itself, so that events within the system cannot in an appreciable amount affect the external fields of force. The system can be in thermodynamic equilibrium only if the external force fields are uniform, and are determining its uniform acceleration, or if it lies in a non-uniform force field but is held stationary there by local forces, such as mechanical pressures, on its surface.

Thermodynamic equilibrium is a primitive notion of the theory of thermodynamics. According to P.M. Morse: "It should be emphasized that the fact that there are thermodynamic states, ..., and the fact that there are thermodynamic variables which are uniquely specified by the equilibrium state ... are not conclusions deduced logically from some philosophical first principles. They are conclusions ineluctably drawn from more than two centuries of experiments." This means that thermodynamic equilibrium is not to be defined solely in terms of other theoretical concepts of thermodynamics. M. Bailyn proposes a fundamental law of thermodynamics that defines and postulates the existence of states of thermodynamic equilibrium.

Textbook definitions of thermodynamic equilibrium are often stated carefully, with some reservation or other.

For example, A. Münster writes: "An isolated system is in thermodynamic equilibrium when, in the system, no changes of state are occurring at a measurable rate." There are two reservations stated here; the system is isolated; any changes of state are immeasurably slow. He discusses the second proviso by giving an account of a mixture oxygen and hydrogen at room temperature in the absence of a catalyst. Münster points out that a thermodynamic equilibrium state is described by fewer macroscopic variables than is any other state of a given system. This is partly, but not entirely, because all flows within and through the system are zero.

R. Haase's presentation of thermodynamics does not start with a restriction to thermodynamic equilibrium because he intends to allow for non-equilibrium thermodynamics. He considers an arbitrary system with time invariant properties. He tests it for thermodynamic equilibrium by cutting it off from all external influences, except external force fields. If after insulation, nothing changes, he says that the system was in equilibrium.

In a section headed "Thermodynamic equilibrium", H.B. Callen defines equilibrium states in a paragraph. He points out that they "are determined by intrinsic factors" within the system. They are "terminal states", towards which the systems evolve, over time, which may occur with "glacial slowness". This statement does not explicitly say that for thermodynamic equilibrium, the system must be isolated; Callen does not spell out what he means by the words "intrinsic factors".

Another textbook writer, C.J. Adkins, explicitly allows thermodynamic equilibrium to occur in a system which is not isolated. His system is, however, closed with respect to transfer of matter. He writes: "In general, the approach to thermodynamic equilibrium will involve both thermal and work-like interactions with the surroundings." He distinguishes such thermodynamic equilibrium from thermal equilibrium, in which only thermal contact is mediating transfer of energy.

Another textbook author, J.R. Partington, writes: "(i) An equilibrium state is one which is independent of time." But, referring to systems "which are only apparently in equilibrium", he adds : "Such systems are in states of ″false equilibrium.″" Partington's statement does not explicitly state that the equilibrium refers to an isolated system. Like Münster, Partington also refers to the mixture of oxygen and hydrogen. He adds a proviso that "In a true equilibrium state, the smallest change of any external condition which influences the state will produce a small change of state ..." This proviso means that thermodynamic equilibrium must be stable against small perturbations; this requirement is essential for the strict meaning of thermodynamic equilibrium.

A student textbook by F.H. Crawford has a section headed "Thermodynamic Equilibrium". It distinguishes several drivers of flows, and then says: "These are examples of the apparently universal tendency of isolated systems toward a state of complete mechanical, thermal, chemical, and electrical—or, in a single word, thermodynamic—equilibrium."

A monograph on classical thermodynamics by H.A. Buchdahl considers the "equilibrium of a thermodynamic system", without actually writing the phrase "thermodynamic equilibrium". Referring to systems closed to exchange of matter, Buchdahl writes: "If a system is in a terminal condition which is properly static, it will be said to be in equilibrium." Buchdahl's monograph also discusses amorphous glass, for the purposes of thermodynamic description. It states: "More precisely, the glass may be regarded as being in equilibrium so long as experimental tests show that 'slow' transitions are in effect reversible." It is not customary to make this proviso part of the definition of thermodynamic equilibrium, but the converse is usually assumed: that if a body in thermodynamic equilibrium is subject to a sufficiently slow process, that process may be considered to be sufficiently nearly reversible, and the body remains sufficiently nearly in thermodynamic equilibrium during the process.

A. Münster carefully extends his definition of thermodynamic equilibrium for isolated systems by introducing a concept of contact equilibrium. This specifies particular processes that are allowed when considering thermodynamic equilibrium for non-isolated systems, with special concern for open systems, which may gain or lose matter from or to their surroundings. A contact equilibrium is between the system of interest and a system in the surroundings, brought into contact with the system of interest, the contact being through a special kind of wall; for the rest, the whole joint system is isolated. Walls of this special kind were also considered by C. Carathéodory, and are mentioned by other writers also. They are selectively permeable. They may be permeable only to mechanical work, or only to heat, or only to some particular chemical substance. Each contact equilibrium defines an intensive parameter; for example, a wall permeable only to heat defines an empirical temperature. A contact equilibrium can exist for each chemical constituent of the system of interest. In a contact equilibrium, despite the possible exchange through the selectively permeable wall, the system of interest is changeless, as if it were in isolated thermodynamic equilibrium. This scheme follows the general rule that "... we can consider an equilibrium only with respect to specified processes and defined experimental conditions." Thermodynamic equilibrium for an open system means that, with respect to every relevant kind of selectively permeable wall, contact equilibrium exists when the respective intensive parameters of the system and surroundings are equal. This definition does not consider the most general kind of thermodynamic equilibrium, which is through unselective contacts. This definition does not simply state that no current of matter or energy exists in the interior or at the boundaries; but it is compatible with the following definition, which does so state.

M. Zemansky also distinguishes mechanical, chemical, and thermal equilibrium. He then writes: "When the conditions for all three types of equilibrium are satisfied, the system is said to be in a state of thermodynamic equilibrium".

P.M. Morse writes that thermodynamics is concerned with "states of thermodynamic equilibrium". He also uses the phrase "thermal equilibrium" while discussing transfer of energy as heat between a body and a heat reservoir in its surroundings, though not explicitly defining a special term 'thermal equilibrium'.

J.R. Waldram writes of "a definite thermodynamic state". He defines the term "thermal equilibrium" for a system "when its observables have ceased to change over time". But shortly below that definition he writes of a piece of glass that has not yet reached its "full thermodynamic equilibrium state".

Considering equilibrium states, M. Bailyn writes: "Each intensive variable has its own type of equilibrium." He then defines thermal equilibrium, mechanical equilibrium, and material equilibrium. Accordingly, he writes: "If all the intensive variables become uniform, thermodynamic equilibrium is said to exist." He is not here considering the presence of an external force field.

J.G. Kirkwood and I. Oppenheim define thermodynamic equilibrium as follows: "A system is in a state of thermodynamic equilibrium if, during the time period allotted for experimentation, (a) its intensive properties are independent of time and (b) no current of matter or energy exists in its interior or at its boundaries with the surroundings." It is evident that they are not restricting the definition to isolated or to closed systems. They do not discuss the possibility of changes that occur with "glacial slowness", and proceed beyond the time period allotted for experimentation. They note that for two systems in contact, there exists a small subclass of intensive properties such that if all those of that small subclass are respectively equal, then all respective intensive properties are equal. States of thermodynamic equilibrium may be defined by this subclass, provided some other conditions are satisfied.

== Characteristics of a state of internal thermodynamic equilibrium ==
=== Homogeneity in the absence of external forces ===
A thermodynamic system consisting of a single phase in the absence of external forces, in its own internal thermodynamic equilibrium, is homogeneous. This means that the material in any small volume element of the system can be interchanged with the material of any other geometrically congruent volume element of the system, and the effect is to leave the system thermodynamically unchanged. In general, a strong external force field makes a system of a single phase in its own internal thermodynamic equilibrium inhomogeneous with respect to some intensive variables. For example, a relatively dense component of a mixture can be concentrated by centrifugation.

=== Uniform temperature ===
Such equilibrium inhomogeneity, induced by external forces, does not occur for the intensive variable temperature. According to E.A. Guggenheim, "The most important conception of thermodynamics is temperature." Planck introduces his treatise with a brief account of heat and temperature and thermal equilibrium, and then announces: "In the following we shall deal chiefly with homogeneous, isotropic bodies of any form, possessing throughout their substance the same temperature and density, and subject to a uniform pressure acting everywhere perpendicular to the surface." As did Carathéodory, Planck was setting aside surface effects and external fields and anisotropic crystals. Though referring to temperature, Planck did not there explicitly refer to the concept of thermodynamic equilibrium. In contrast, Carathéodory's scheme of presentation of classical thermodynamics for closed systems postulates the concept of an "equilibrium state" following Gibbs (Gibbs speaks routinely of a "thermodynamic state"), though not explicitly using the phrase 'thermodynamic equilibrium', nor explicitly postulating the existence of a temperature to define it.

Although thermodynamic laws are immutable, systems can be created that delay the time to reach thermodynamic equilibrium. In a thought experiment, Reed A. Howald conceived of a system called "The Fizz Keeper" consisting of a cap with a nozzle that can re-pressurize any standard bottle of carbonated beverage. Nitrogen and oxygen, which air are mostly made out of, would keep getting pumped in, which would slow down the rate at which the carbon dioxide fizzles out of the system. This is possible because the thermodynamic equilibrium between the unconverted and converted carbon dioxide inside the bottle would stay the same. To come to this conclusion, he also appeals to Henry's Law, which states that gases dissolve in direct proportion to their partial pressures. By influencing the partial pressure on the top of a closed system, this would help slow down the rate of fizzing out of carbonated beverages which is governed by thermodynamic equilibrium. The equilibria of carbon dioxide and other gases would not change, however the partial pressure on top would slow down the rate of dissolution extending the time a gas stays in a particular state due to the nature of thermal equilibrium of the remainder of the beverage. The equilibrium constant of carbon dioxide would be completely independent of the nitrogen and oxygen pumped into the system, which would slow down the diffusion of gas, and yet not have an impact on the thermodynamics of the entire system.

The temperature within a system in thermodynamic equilibrium is uniform in space as well as in time. In a system in its own state of internal thermodynamic equilibrium, there are no net internal macroscopic flows. In particular, this means that all local parts of the system are in mutual radiative exchange equilibrium. This means that the temperature of the system is spatially uniform. This is so in all cases, including those of non-uniform external force fields. For an externally imposed gravitational field, this may be proved in macroscopic thermodynamic terms, by the calculus of variations, using the method of Langrangian multipliers. Considerations of kinetic theory or statistical mechanics also support this statement.

In order that a system may be in its own internal state of thermodynamic equilibrium, it is of course necessary, but not sufficient, that it be in its own internal state of thermal equilibrium; it is possible for a system to reach internal mechanical equilibrium before it reaches internal thermal equilibrium.

=== Number of real variables needed for specification ===
In his exposition of his scheme of closed system equilibrium thermodynamics, C. Carathéodory initially postulates that experiment reveals that a definite number of real variables define the states that are the points of the manifold of equilibria. In the words of Prigogine and Defay (1945): "It is a matter of experience that when we have specified a certain number of macroscopic properties of a system, then all the other properties are fixed." As noted above, according to A. Münster, the number of variables needed to define a thermodynamic equilibrium is the least for any state of a given isolated system. As noted above, J.G. Kirkwood and I. Oppenheim point out that a state of thermodynamic equilibrium may be defined by a special subclass of intensive variables, with a definite number of members in that subclass.

If the thermodynamic equilibrium lies in an external force field, it is only the temperature that can in general be expected to be spatially uniform. Intensive variables other than temperature will in general be non-uniform if the external force field is non-zero. In such a case, in general, additional variables are needed to describe the spatial non-uniformity.

=== Stability against small perturbations ===
As noted above, J.R. Partington points out that a state of thermodynamic equilibrium is stable against small transient perturbations. Without this condition, in general, experiments intended to study systems in thermodynamic equilibrium are in severe difficulties.

=== Approach to thermodynamic equilibrium within an isolated system ===
When a body of material starts from a non-equilibrium state of inhomogeneity or chemical non-equilibrium, and is then isolated, it spontaneously evolves towards its own internal state of thermodynamic equilibrium. It is not necessary that all aspects of internal thermodynamic equilibrium be reached simultaneously; some can be established before others. For example, in many cases of such evolution, internal mechanical equilibrium is established much more rapidly than the other aspects of the eventual thermodynamic equilibrium. Another example is that, in many cases of such evolution, thermal equilibrium is reached much more rapidly than chemical equilibrium.

=== Fluctuations within an isolated system in its own internal thermodynamic equilibrium ===
In an isolated system, thermodynamic equilibrium by definition persists over an indefinitely long time. In classical physics it is often convenient to ignore the effects of measurement and this is assumed in the present account.

To consider the notion of fluctuations in an isolated thermodynamic system, a convenient example is a system specified by its extensive state variables, internal energy, volume, and mass composition. By definition they are time-invariant. By definition, they combine with time-invariant nominal values of their conjugate intensive functions of state, inverse temperature, pressure divided by temperature, and the chemical potentials divided by temperature, so as to exactly obey the laws of thermodynamics. But the laws of thermodynamics, combined with the values of the specifying extensive variables of state, are not sufficient to provide knowledge of those nominal values. Further information is needed, namely, of the constitutive properties of the system.

It may be admitted that on repeated measurement of those conjugate intensive functions of state, they are found to have slightly different values from time to time. Such variability is regarded as due to internal fluctuations. The different measured values average to their nominal values.

If the system is truly macroscopic as postulated by classical thermodynamics, then the fluctuations are too small to detect macroscopically. This is called the thermodynamic limit. In effect, the molecular nature of matter and the quantal nature of momentum transfer have vanished from sight, too small to see. According to Buchdahl: "... there is no place within the strictly phenomenological theory for the idea of fluctuations about equilibrium (see, however, Section 76)."

If the system is repeatedly subdivided, eventually a system is produced that is small enough to exhibit obvious fluctuations. This is a mesoscopic level of investigation. The fluctuations are then directly dependent on the natures of the various walls of the system. The precise choice of independent state variables is then important. At this stage, statistical features of the laws of thermodynamics become apparent.

If the mesoscopic system is further repeatedly divided, eventually a microscopic system is produced. Then the molecular character of matter and the quantal nature of momentum transfer become important in the processes of fluctuation. One has left the realm of classical or macroscopic thermodynamics, and one needs quantum statistical mechanics. The fluctuations can become relatively dominant, and questions of measurement become important.

The statement that 'the system is its own internal thermodynamic equilibrium' may be taken to mean that 'indefinitely many such measurements have been taken from time to time, with no trend in time in the various measured values'. Thus the statement, that 'a system is in its own internal thermodynamic equilibrium, with stated nominal values of its functions of state conjugate to its specifying state variables', is far far more informative than a statement that 'a set of single simultaneous measurements of those functions of state have those same values'. This is because the single measurements might have been made during a slight fluctuation, away from another set of nominal values of those conjugate intensive functions of state, that is due to unknown and different constitutive properties. A single measurement cannot tell whether that might be so, unless there is also knowledge of the nominal values that belong to the equilibrium state.

=== Thermal equilibrium ===
Thermal equilibrium is achieved when two systems in thermal contact with each other cease to have a net exchange of energy. It follows that if two systems are in thermal equilibrium, then their temperatures are the same.

Thermal equilibrium occurs when a system's macroscopic thermal observables have ceased to change with time. For example, an ideal gas whose distribution function has stabilised to a specific Maxwell–Boltzmann distribution would be in thermal equilibrium. This outcome allows a single temperature and pressure to be attributed to the whole system. For an isolated body, it is quite possible for mechanical equilibrium to be reached before thermal equilibrium is reached, but eventually, all aspects of equilibrium, including thermal equilibrium, are necessary for thermodynamic equilibrium.

An explicit distinction between 'thermal equilibrium' and 'thermodynamic equilibrium' is made by B. C. Eu. He considers two systems in thermal contact, one a thermometer, the other a system in which there are several occurring irreversible processes, entailing non-zero fluxes; the two systems are separated by a wall permeable only to heat. He considers the case in which, over the time scale of interest, it happens that both the thermometer reading and the irreversible processes are steady. Then there is thermal equilibrium without thermodynamic equilibrium. Eu proposes consequently that the zeroth law of thermodynamics can be considered to apply even when thermodynamic equilibrium is not present; also he proposes that if changes are occurring so fast that a steady temperature cannot be defined, then "it is no longer possible to describe the process by means of a thermodynamic formalism. In other words, thermodynamics has no meaning for such a process." This illustrates the importance for thermodynamics of the concept of temperature.

== Non-equilibrium ==
A system's internal state of thermodynamic equilibrium should be distinguished from a "stationary state" in which thermodynamic parameters are unchanging in time but the system is not isolated, so that there are, into and out of the system, non-zero macroscopic fluxes which are constant in time.

Non-equilibrium thermodynamics is a branch of thermodynamics that deals with systems that are not in thermodynamic equilibrium. Most systems found in nature are not in thermodynamic equilibrium because they are changing or can be triggered to change over time, and are continuously and discontinuously subject to flux of matter and energy to and from other systems. The thermodynamic study of non-equilibrium systems requires more general concepts than are dealt with by equilibrium thermodynamics. Many natural systems still today remain beyond the scope of currently known macroscopic thermodynamic methods.

Laws governing systems which are far from equilibrium are also debatable. One of the guiding principles for these systems is the maximum entropy production principle. It states that a non-equilibrium system evolves such as to maximize its entropy production.

== See also ==
Thermodynamic models

- Non-random two-liquid model (NRTL model) - Phase equilibrium calculations
- UNIQUAC model - Phase equilibrium calculations
- Time crystal

Topics in control theory

- Coefficient diagram method
- Control reconfiguration
- Feedback
- H infinity
- Hankel singular value
- Krener's theorem
- Lead-lag compensator
- Markov chain approximation method
- Minor loop feedback
- Multi-loop feedback
- Positive systems
- Radial basis function
- Root locus
- Signal-flow graphs
- Stable polynomial
- State space representation
- Steady state
- Transient state
- Underactuation
- Youla–Kucera parametrization

Other related topics

- Automation and remote control
- Bond graph
- Control engineering
- Control–feedback–abort loop
- Controller (control theory)
- Cybernetics
- Intelligent control
- Mathematical system theory
- Negative feedback amplifier
- People in systems and control
- Perceptual control theory
- Systems theory
- Time scale calculus

== General references ==
- C. Michael Hogan, Leda C. Patmore and Harry Seidman (1973) Statistical Prediction of Dynamic Thermal Equilibrium Temperatures using Standard Meteorological Data Bases, Second Edition (EPA-660/2-73-003 2006) United States Environmental Protection Agency Office of Research and Development, Washington, D.C.
- Cesare Barbieri (2007) Fundamentals of Astronomy. First Edition (QB43.3.B37 2006) CRC Press ISBN 0-7503-0886-9, ISBN 978-0-7503-0886-1
- F. Mandl (1988) Statistical Physics, Second Edition, John Wiley & Sons
- Hans R. Griem (2005) Principles of Plasma Spectroscopy (Cambridge Monographs on Plasma Physics), Cambridge University Press, New York ISBN 0-521-61941-6

== Cited bibliography ==
- Adkins, C.J. (1968/1983). Equilibrium Thermodynamics, third edition, McGraw-Hill, London, ISBN 0-521-25445-0.
- Bailyn, M. (1994). A Survey of Thermodynamics, American Institute of Physics Press, New York, ISBN 0-88318-797-3.
- Beattie, J.A., Oppenheim, I. (1979). Principles of Thermodynamics, Elsevier Scientific Publishing, Amsterdam, ISBN 0-444-41806-7.
- Boltzmann, L. (1896/1964). Lectures on Gas Theory, translated by S.G. Brush, University of California Press, Berkeley.
- Buchdahl, H.A. (1966). The Concepts of Classical Thermodynamics, Cambridge University Press, Cambridge UK.
- Callen, H.B. (1960/1985). Thermodynamics and an Introduction to Thermostatistics, (1st edition 1960) 2nd edition 1985, Wiley, New York, ISBN 0-471-86256-8.
- Carathéodory, C. (1909). Untersuchungen über die Grundlagen der Thermodynamik, Mathematische Annalen, 67: 355–386. A translation may be found here. Also a mostly reliable translation is to be found at Kestin, J. (1976). The Second Law of Thermodynamics, Dowden, Hutchinson & Ross, Stroudsburg PA.
- Chapman, S., Cowling, T.G. (1939/1970). The Mathematical Theory of Non-uniform gases. An Account of the Kinetic Theory of Viscosity, Thermal Conduction and Diffusion in Gases, third edition 1970, Cambridge University Press, London.
- Crawford, F.H. (1963). Heat, Thermodynamics, and Statistical Physics, Rupert Hart-Davis, London, Harcourt, Brace & World, Inc.
- de Groot, S.R., Mazur, P. (1962). Non-equilibrium Thermodynamics, North-Holland, Amsterdam. Reprinted (1984), Dover Publications Inc., New York, ISBN 0486647412.
- Denbigh, K.G. (1951). Thermodynamics of the Steady State, Methuen, London.
- Eu, B.C. (2002). Generalized Thermodynamics. The Thermodynamics of Irreversible Processes and Generalized Hydrodynamics, Kluwer Academic Publishers, Dordrecht, ISBN 1-4020-0788-4.
- Fitts, D.D. (1962). Nonequilibrium thermodynamics. A Phenomenological Theory of Irreversible Processes in Fluid Systems, McGraw-Hill, New York.
- Gibbs, J.W. (1876/1878). On the equilibrium of heterogeneous substances, Trans. Conn. Acad., 3: 108–248, 343–524, reprinted in The Collected Works of J. Willard Gibbs, PhD, LL. D., edited by W.R. Longley, R.G. Van Name, Longmans, Green & Co., New York, 1928, volume 1, pp. 55–353.
- Griem, H.R. (2005). Principles of Plasma Spectroscopy (Cambridge Monographs on Plasma Physics), Cambridge University Press, New York ISBN 0-521-61941-6.
- Guggenheim, E.A. (1949/1967). Thermodynamics. An Advanced Treatment for Chemists and Physicists, fifth revised edition, North-Holland, Amsterdam.
- Haase, R. (1971). Survey of Fundamental Laws, chapter 1 of Thermodynamics, pages 1–97 of volume 1, ed. W. Jost, of Physical Chemistry. An Advanced Treatise, ed. H. Eyring, D. Henderson, W. Jost, Academic Press, New York, lcn 73–117081.
- Kirkwood, J.G., Oppenheim, I. (1961). Chemical Thermodynamics, McGraw-Hill Book Company, New York.
- Landsberg, P.T. (1961). Thermodynamics with Quantum Statistical Illustrations, Interscience, New York.
- Levine, I.N. (1983), Physical Chemistry, second edition, McGraw-Hill, New York, ISBN 978-0072538625.
- Lieb, E. H.; Yngvason, J. (1999). "The Physics and Mathematics of the Second Law of Thermodynamics". Phys. Rep. 310 (1): 1–96. arXiv:cond-mat/9708200. Bibcode:1999PhR...310....1L. doi:10.1016/S0370-1573(98)00082-9. S2CID 119620408.
- Maxwell, J.C. (1867). "On the dynamical theory of gases". Phil. Trans. R. Soc. Lond. 157: 49–88. Bibcode:1867RSPT..157...49C.
- Morse, P.M. (1969). Thermal Physics, second edition, W.A. Benjamin, Inc, New York.
- Münster, A. (1970). Classical Thermodynamics, translated by E.S. Halberstadt, Wiley–Interscience, London.
- Partington, J.R. (1949). An Advanced Treatise on Physical Chemistry, volume 1, Fundamental Principles. The Properties of Gases, Longmans, Green and Co., London.
- Pippard, A.B. (1957/1966). The Elements of Classical Thermodynamics, reprinted with corrections 1966, Cambridge University Press, London.
- Planck. M. (1914). The Theory of Heat Radiation, a translation by Masius, M. of the second German edition, P. Blakiston's Son & Co., Philadelphia.
- Prigogine, I. (1947). Étude Thermodynamique des Phénomènes irréversibles, Dunod, Paris, and Desoers, Liège.
- Prigogine, I., Defay, R. (1950/1954). Chemical Thermodynamics, Longmans, Green & Co, London.
- Silbey, R.J., Alberty, R.A., Bawendi, M.G. (1955/2005). Physical Chemistry, fourth edition, Wiley, Hoboken NJ.
- ter Haar, D., Wergeland, H. (1966). Elements of Thermodynamics, Addison-Wesley Publishing, Reading MA.
- Thomson, W. (March 1851). "On the Dynamical Theory of Heat, with numerical results deduced from Mr Joule's equivalent of a Thermal Unit, and M. Regnault's Observations on Steam". Transactions of the Royal Society of Edinburgh. XX (part II): 261–268, 289–298. Also published in Thomson, W. (December 1852). "On the Dynamical Theory of Heat, with numerical results deduced from Mr Joule's equivalent of a Thermal Unit, and M. Regnault's Observations on Steam". Phil. Mag. 4. IV (22): 8–21.
- Tisza, L. (1966). Generalized Thermodynamics, M.I.T Press, Cambridge MA.
- Uhlenbeck, G.E., Ford, G.W. (1963). Lectures in Statistical Mechanics, American Mathematical Society, Providence RI.
- Waldram, J.R. (1985). The Theory of Thermodynamics, Cambridge University Press, Cambridge UK, ISBN 0-521-24575-3.
- Zemansky, M. (1937/1968). Heat and Thermodynamics. An Intermediate Textbook, fifth edition 1967, McGraw–Hill Book Company, New York.
