= Outline of control engineering =

Overview of and topical guide to control engineering

The following outline is provided as an overview of and topical guide to control engineering:

Control engineering – engineering discipline that applies control theory to design systems with desired behaviors. The practice uses sensors to measure the output performance of the device being controlled and those measurements can be used to give feedback to the input actuators that can make corrections toward desired performance. When a device is designed to perform without the need of human inputs for correction it is called automatic control (such as cruise control for regulating a car's speed).

== Branches ==
- Adaptive control
- Control theory – interdisciplinary branch of engineering and mathematics that deals with the behavior of dynamical systems. The usual objective of control theory is to calculate solutions for the proper corrective action from the controller that result in system stability.
- Digital control
- Energy-shaping control
- Fuzzy control
- Hybrid control
- Intelligent control
- Model predictive control
- Multivariable control
- Neural control
- Nonlinear control
- Optimal control
- Real-time control
- Robust control
- Stochastic control

== Mathematical concepts ==
- Complex analysis
- Differential equations
- Linear algebra
- Mathematical system theory
- Matrices
- Real analysis
- Variational calculus

== System properties ==
- Bode plot
- Block diagram
- Closed-loop transfer function
- Controllability
- Fourier transform
- Frequency response
- Laplace transform
- Negative feedback
- Observability
- Performance
- Positive feedback
- Root locus method
- Servomechanism
- Signal-flow graph
- State space representation
- Stability theory
- Steady state analysis & design
- System dynamics
- Transfer function

== Digital control ==
- Discrete-time signal
- Digital signal processing
- Quantization
- Real-time software
- sampled data
- System identification
- Z transform

== Advanced techniques ==
- Artificial neural networks
- Coefficient diagram method
- Control reconfiguration
- Distributed parameter systems
- Fractional-order control
- Fuzzy logic
- H-infinity loop-shaping
- Hankel singular value
- Kalman filter
- Krener's theorem
- Least squares
- Lyapunov stability
- Minor loop feedback
- Perceptual control theory
- State observer
- Vector control

== Tools ==
- Labview
- Matlab
- Simulink

== Controllers ==
- Embedded controller
- Closed-loop controller
- Lead-lag compensator
- Numerical control
- PID controller
- Programmable logic controller

== Control applications ==
- Automation and remote control
- Distributed control system
- Electric motors
- Industrial control systems
- Mechatronics
- Motion control
- Process Control
- Robotics
- Supervisory control (SCADA)

== Control engineering organizations ==
- Control System Integrators Association
- International Federation of Automatic Control

== Persons influential in control engineering ==
- People in systems and control

== See also ==
- Outline of automation
- Outline of engineering
- Outline of manufacturing
- Outline of production
- Outline of robotics
