= Reconfigure =

To reconfigure refers to:

- Reconfigurable computing: changing the data path of a computing system in addition to the control flow
- Control reconfiguration: changing the loop structure and controller parameters in an automatic control loop
- Reconfigurable antenna: changing the antenna physically or electrically to control its antenna properties
