= Hyperpolarization (biology) =

Change in a cell membrane potential causing it to become more negative

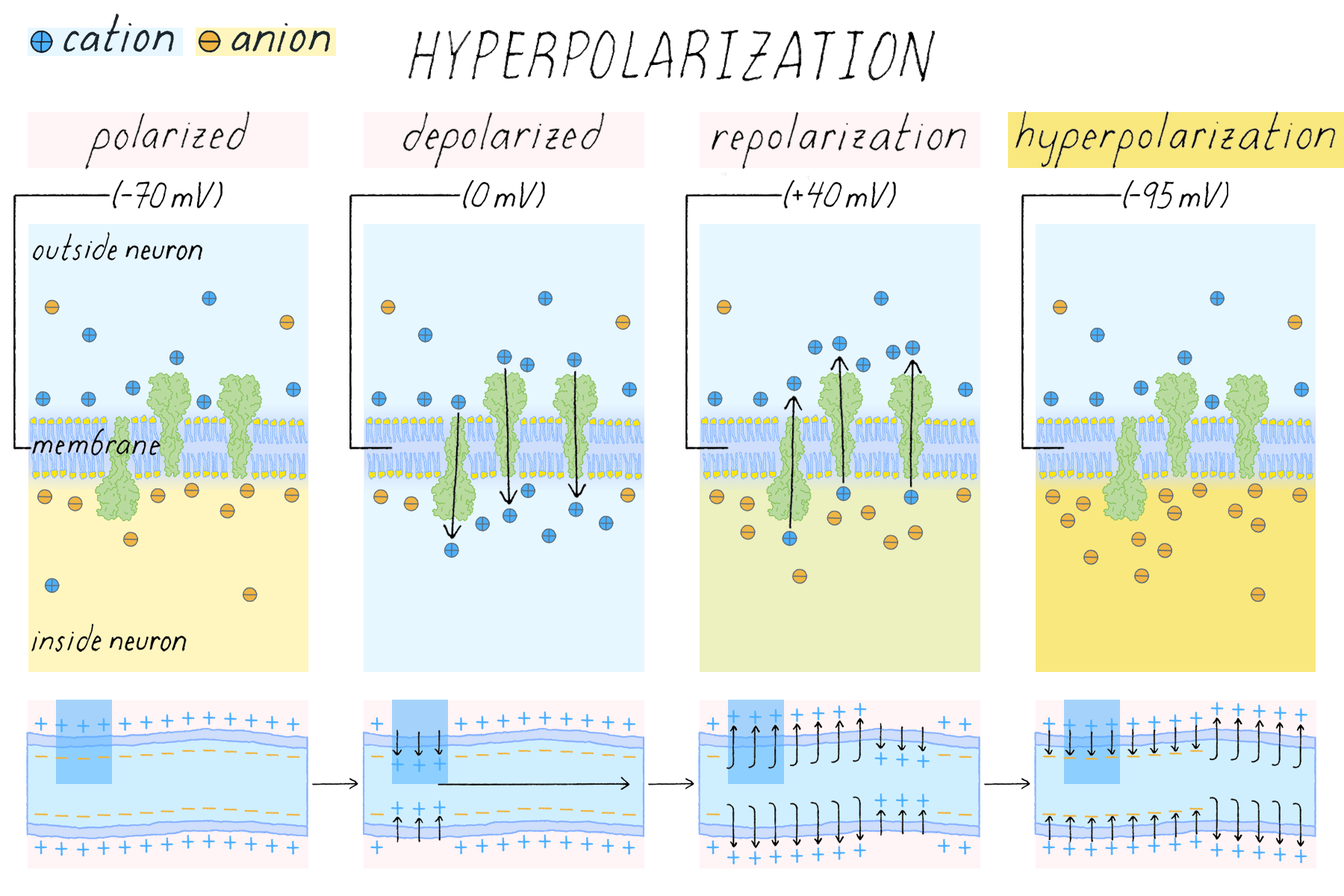
A state in which the electrical charge across a cell membrane is increased compared to its resting state.

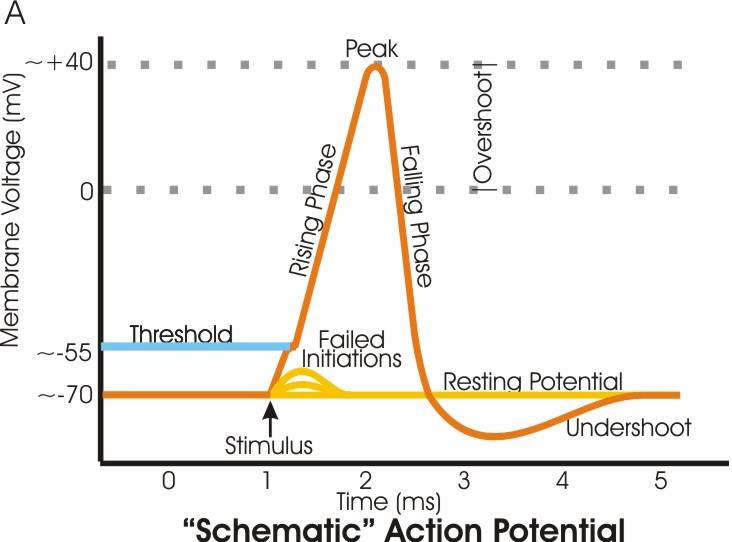
Diagram of membrane potential changes during an action potential

Hyperpolarization is a change in a cell's membrane potential that makes it more negative. Living cells typically have a negative resting potential. Animal excitable cells (neurons, muscle cells or gland cells), as well as cells of other organisms, may have their membrane potential temporarily deviate from the resting value. This is one of many mechanisms of cell signaling.

In excitable cells, activation is typically achieved through depolarization, i.e., the membrane potential deviating towards less negative values. Thus, hyperpolarization, as an opposite process, makes the cell more difficult to activate. When the membrane potential is more negative, a stronger stimulus is needed to surpass the activation threshold.

Neurons naturally become hyperpolarized at the end of an action potential, which is often referred to as the relative refractory period. Relative refractory periods typically last 2 milliseconds, during which a stronger stimulus is needed to trigger another action potential. Cells can also become hyperpolarized depending on channels and receptors present on the membrane, which can have an inhibitory effect.

Hyperpolarization is often caused by efflux of K^{+} (a cation) through K^{+} channels, or influx of Cl^{–} (an anion) through Cl^{–} channels. On the other hand, influx of cations, e.g. Na^{+} through Na^{+} channels or Ca^{2+} through Ca^{2+} channels, inhibits hyperpolarization. If a cell has Na^{+} or Ca^{2+} currents at rest, then inhibition of those currents will also result in hyperpolarization. This voltage-gated ion channel response is how the hyperpolarization state is achieved.

== Voltage-gated ion channels and hyperpolarization ==
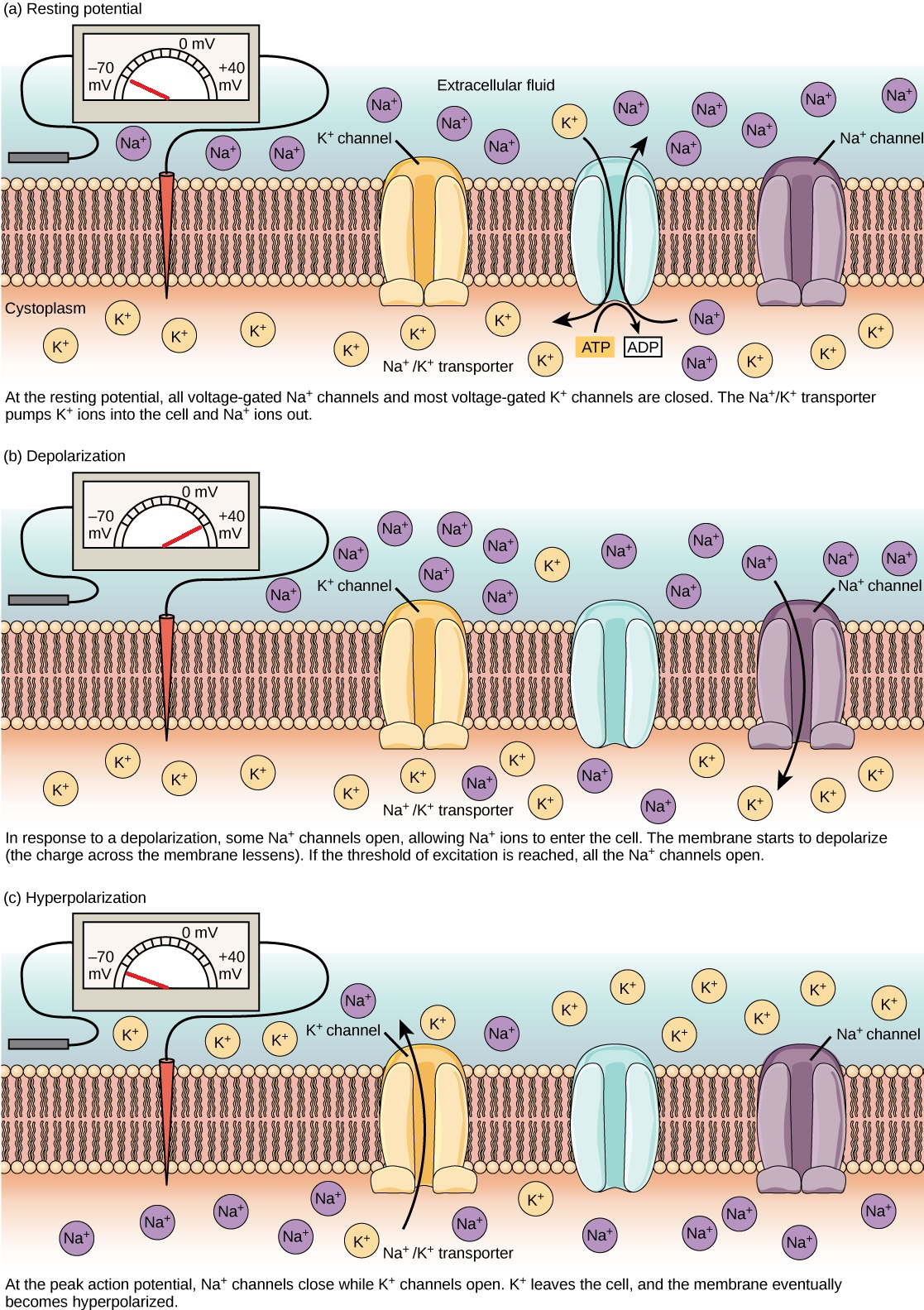
The (a) resting membrane potential is a result of different concentrations of Na^{+} and K^{+} ions inside and outside the cell. A nerve impulse causes Na^{+} to enter the cell, resulting in (b) depolarization. At the peak action potential, K^{+} channels open and the cell becomes (c) hyperpolarized.

Voltage gated ion channels respond to changes in the membrane potential. Voltage gated potassium, chloride and sodium channels are key components in the generation of the action potential as well as hyper-polarization. These channels work by selecting an ion based on electrostatic attraction or repulsion, allowing the ion to bind to the channel. This releases the water molecule attached to the channel and the ion is passed through the pore. Voltage gated sodium channels open in response to a stimulus and close again. This means the channel either is open or not, there is no part way open. Sometimes the channel closes but is able to be reopened right away, known as channel gating, or it can be closed without being able to be reopened right away, known as channel inactivation.

At resting potential, both the voltage gated sodium and potassium channels are closed but as the cell membrane becomes depolarized the voltage gated sodium channels begin to open up and the neuron begins to depolarize, creating a current feedback loop known as the Hodgkin cycle. However, potassium ions naturally move out of the cell and if the original depolarization event was not significant enough then the neuron does not generate an action potential. If all the sodium channels are open, however, then the neuron becomes ten times more permeable to sodium than potassium, quickly depolarizing the cell to a peak of +40 mV. At this level the sodium channels begin to inactivate and voltage gated potassium channels begin to open. This combination of closed sodium channels and open potassium channels leads to the neuron re-polarizing and becoming negative again. The neuron continues to re-polarize until the cell reaches ~ –75 mV, which is the equilibrium potential of potassium ions. This is the point at which the neuron is hyperpolarized, between –70 mV and –75 mV. After hyperpolarization the potassium channels close and the natural permeability of the neuron to sodium and potassium allows the neuron to return to its resting potential of –70 mV. During the refractory period, which is after hyper-polarization but before the neuron has returned to its resting potential the neuron is capable of triggering an action potential due to the sodium channels ability to be opened, however, because the neuron is more negative it becomes more difficult to reach the action potential threshold.

HCN channels are activated by hyperpolarization.

Recent research has shown that neuronal refractory periods can exceed 20 milliseconds where the relation between hyperpolarization and the neuronal refractory was questioned.

== Experimental technique ==
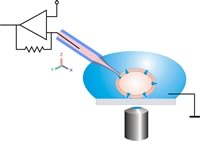
This image shows a model of a patch clamp used in neuroscience. The pipette tip is placed at an ion channel opening and a current is applied and measured using a voltage clamp.

Hyperpolarization is a change in membrane potential. Neuroscientists measure it using a technique known as patch clamping that allows them to record ion currents passing through individual channels. This is done using a glass micropipette, also called a patch pipette, with a 1 micrometer diameter. There is a small patch that contains a few ion channels and the rest is sealed off, making this the point of entry for the current. Using an amplifier and a voltage clamp, which is an electronic feedback circuit, allows the experimenter to maintain the membrane potential at a fixed point and the voltage clamp then measures tiny changes in current flow. The membrane currents giving rise to hyperpolarization are either an increase in outward current or a decrease in inward current.

== Examples ==
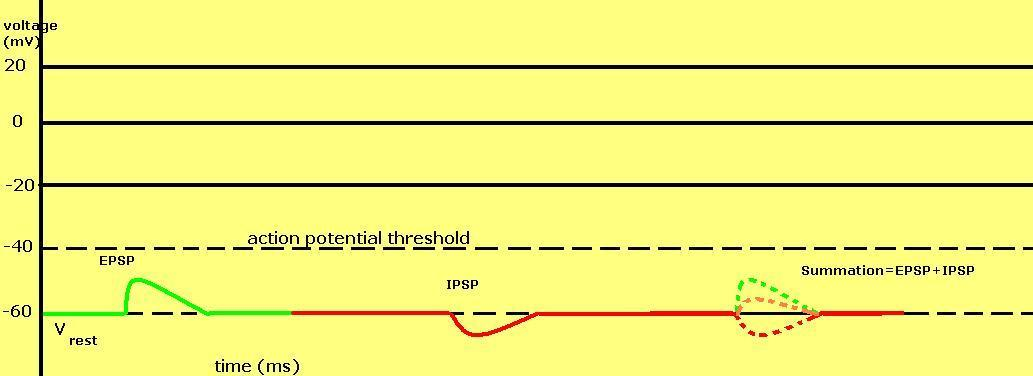
An example of inhibitory postsynaptic potentials (IPSPs), excitatory postsynaptic potentials (EPSPs), and their summation.

GABA receptors are commonly known to downregulate neuronal activity by various means.

1. GABA_{A} can induce hyperpolarization through an influx of Cl^{–} ions. GABA_{A} itself is a chloride ion channel. This process of hyperpolarization is highly dependent on which direction Cl^{–} flows. If Cl^{–} travels into the cell, the flow of ions increases the voltage gradient. If Cl^{–} flows out of the cell, the voltage gradient will decrease.
2. GABA_{B} induces hyperpolarization through K^{+} ion influx into the neuron. Unlike GABA_{A}, GABA_{B} is a G-Protein Coupled Receptor that activates potassium channels via Protein Kinase A (PKA) activation. Potassium typically has a higher concentration inside the cell, while sodium typically has a higher concentration outside. When potassium channels open, K^{+} ions flow out of the cell and cause the cell's internal potential to become more negative. GABA_{B} activation of PKA also leads to Ca channel inactivation in presynaptic neurons. This likely leads to inhibited synaptic transmission.

Hyperpolarization-activated cyclic nucleotide-gated (HCN) channels have been identified as channels that mediate hyperpolarization. They were initially discovered in pacemaker cells of the heart. These channels are controlled by cAMP, and activated by a hyperpolarized membrane. They allow the flow of Na^{+} and K^{+} ions, typically leading to a slight depolarization.
