= Machine diagnosis =

Machine diagnosis may refer to:

- Machine fault diagnosis, diagnosis made on a machine
- Clinical decision support system, diagnosis assisted by a machine
