= Energy-shaping control =

Energy-shaping control for energy systems considers the plant and its controller as energy-transformation devices. The control strategy is formulated in terms of interconnection (in a power-preserving manner) in order to achieve a desired behavior.

== See also ==
- Control theory
