= Warren E. Dixon =

- Education: Clemson University
- Scientific career
- Fields: Control theory
- Workplaces: Virginia Polytechnic Institute and State University

Warren E. Dixon is a control theorist and the dean of the College of Engineering at Virginia Tech. He was selected as Dean in 2026.

== Bibliography ==
- Dixon, W.E.; Dawson, D.M.; Zergeroglu, E.; Behal, A. (2001). Nonlinear Control of Wheeled Mobile Robots. Lecture Notes in Control and Information Sciences. Vol. 262. Springer London. doi:10.1007/BFb0113116. ISBN 978-1-85233-414-7.
- Dixon, W.E.; Behal, A.; Dawson, D.M.; Nagarkatti, S.P. (2012). Nonlinear Control of Engineering Systems: A Lyapunov-Based Approach. Control Engineering. Birkhäuser. doi:10.1007/978-1-4612-0031-4. ISBN 978-1-4612-6581-8.
