= Automation and Remote Control =

- Discipline: Control theory
- Language: English
- Edited by: Andrey A. Galyaev

Publication details
- History: 1936–present
- Publisher: Springer Science+Business Media on behalf of MAIK Nauka/Interperiodica Press (Russia)
- Frequency: Monthly
- Impact factor: 0.7 (2022)

Standard abbreviations
- ISO 4: Autom. Remote Control

Indexing
- CODEN: AURCAT
- ISSN: 0005-1179 (print); 1608-3032 (web)
- LCCN: 56038628
- OCLC no.: 746953541

Links
- Journal homepage

Automation and Remote Control (Russian: Автоматика и Телемеханика, romanized: Avtomatika i Telemekhanika) is a Russian scientific journal published by MAIK Nauka/Interperiodica Press and distributed in English by Springer Science+Business Media.

The journal was established in April 1936 by the USSR Academy of Sciences Department of Control Processes Problems. Cofounders were the Trapeznikov Institute of Control Sciences and the Institute of Information Transmission Problems. The journal covers research on control theory problems and applications. The editor-in-chief is Andrey A. Galyaev. According to the Journal Citation Reports, the journal has a 2022 impact factor of 0.7.

== History ==
The journal was established in April 1936 and published bimonthly. Since 1956 the journal has been a monthly publication and was translated into English and published in the United States under the title Automation and Remote Control by Plenum Publishing Corporation. During its existence, the scope of the journal substantially evolved and expanded to reflect virtually all subjects concerned in one way or another with the current science of automation and control systems. The journal publishes surveys, original papers, and short communications.
