= Coefficient diagram method =

In control theory, the coefficient diagram method (CDM) is an algebraic approach applied to a polynomial loop in the parameter space.

== Method ==
A special diagram called a "coefficient diagram" is used as the vehicle to carry the necessary information and as the criterion of good design. The performance of the closed-loop system is monitored by the coefficient diagram.

== Advantages ==
The most considerable advantages of CDM can be listed as follows:

1. The design procedure is easily understandable, systematic and useful. Therefore, the coefficients of the CDM controller polynomials can be determined more easily than those of the PID or other types of controller. This creates the possibility of an easy realisation for a new designer to control any kind of system.
2. There are explicit relations between the performance parameters specified before the design and the coefficients of the controller polynomials as described in. For this reason, the designer can easily realize many control systems having different performance properties for a given control problem in a wide range of freedom.
3. The development of different tuning methods is required for time delay processes of different properties in PID control. But it is sufficient to use the single design procedure in the CDM technique. This is an outstanding advantage.
4. It is particularly hard to design robust controllers realizing the desired performance properties for unstable, integrating and oscillatory processes having poles near the imaginary axis. It has been reported that successful designs can be achieved even in these cases by using CDM.
5. It is theoretically proven that CDM design is equivalent to LQ design with proper state augmentation. Thus, CDM can be considered an ‘‘improved LQG’’, because the order of the controller is smaller and weight selection rules are also given.

== Controller ==
It is usually required that the controller for a given plant should be designed under some practical limitations. The controller is desired to be of minimum degree, minimum phase (if possible) and stable. It must have enough bandwidth and power rating limitations. If the controller is designed without considering these limitations, the robustness property will be very poor, even though the stability and time response requirements are met. CDM controllers designed while considering all these problems is of the lowest degree, has a convenient bandwidth and results with a unit step time response without an overshoot. These properties guarantee the robustness, the sufficient damping of the disturbance effects and the low economic property.

== Principles ==
Although the main principles of CDM have been known since the 1950s, the first systematic method was proposed by Shunji Manabe. He developed a new method that easily builds a target characteristic polynomial to meet the desired time response. CDM is an algebraic approach combining classical and modern control theories and uses polynomial representation in the mathematical expression. The advantages of the classical and modern control techniques are integrated with the basic principles of this method, which is derived by making use of the previous experience and knowledge of the controller design. Thus, an efficient and fertile control method has appeared as a tool with which control systems can be designed without needing much experience and without confronting many problems.

== Design use ==
Many control systems have been designed successfully using CDM. It is very easy to design a controller under the conditions of stability, time domain performance and robustness. The close relations between these conditions and coefficients of the characteristic polynomial can be simply determined. This means that CDM is effective not only for control system design but also for controller parameters tuning.

== See also ==
- Polynomials
