= Control reconfiguration =

Approach in control theory to achieve fault-tolerant control for dynamic systems

Control reconfiguration is an active approach in control theory to achieve fault-tolerant control for dynamic systems. It is used when severe faults, such as actuator or sensor outages, cause a break-up of the control loop, which must be restructured to prevent failure at the system level. In addition to loop restructuring, the controller parameters must be adjusted to accommodate changed plant dynamics. Control reconfiguration is a building block toward increasing the dependability of systems under feedback control.

== Reconfiguration problem ==
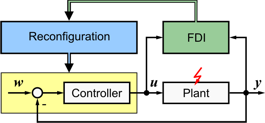
Schematic diagram of a typical active fault-tolerant control system. In the nominal, i.e. fault-free situation, the lower control loop operates to meet the control goals. The fault-detection (FDI) module monitors the closed-loop system to detect and isolate faults. The fault estimate is passed to the reconfiguration block, which modifies the control loop to reach the control goals in spite of the fault.

=== Fault modelling ===
The figure to the right shows a plant controlled by a controller in a standard control loop.

The nominal linear model of the plant is

$$\begin{cases}\dot{\mathbf{x}} & = \mathbf{A}\mathbf{x} + \mathbf{B}\mathbf{u}\\
\mathbf{y} & = \mathbf{C}\mathbf{x}\end{cases}$$

The plant subject to a fault (indicated by a red arrow in the figure) is modelled in general by

$$\begin{cases}\dot{\mathbf{x}}_f & = \mathbf{A}_f\mathbf{x}_f + \mathbf{B}_f\mathbf{u}\\
\mathbf{y}_f & = \mathbf{C}_f\mathbf{x}_f\end{cases}$$

where the subscript $f$ indicates that the system is faulty. This approach models multiplicative faults by modified system matrices. Specifically, actuator faults are represented by the new input matrix $\mathbf{B}_f$, sensor faults are represented by the output map $\mathbf{C}_f$, and internal plant faults are represented by the system matrix $\mathbf{A}_f$.

The upper part of the figure shows a supervisory loop consisting of fault detection and isolation (FDI) and reconfiguration which changes the loop by

1. choosing new input and output signals from {$\mathbf{u},\mathbf{y}$} to reach the control goal,
2. changing the controller internals (including dynamic structure and parameters),
3. adjusting the reference input $\mathbf{w}$.

To this end, the vectors of inputs and outputs contain all available signals, not just those used by the controller in fault-free operation.

Alternative scenarios can model faults as an additive external signal $\mathbf{f}$ influencing the state derivatives and outputs as follows:

$$\begin{cases}\dot{\mathbf{x}}_f & = \mathbf{A}\mathbf{x}_f + \mathbf{B}\mathbf{u} + \mathbf{E}\mathbf{f}\\
\mathbf{y}_f & = \mathbf{C}_f\mathbf{x}_f + \mathbf{F}\mathbf{f}\end{cases}$$

=== Reconfiguration goals ===
The goal of reconfiguration is to keep the reconfigured control-loop performance sufficient for preventing plant shutdown. The following goals are distinguished:

1. Stabilization
2. Equilibrium recovery
3. Output trajectory recovery
4. State trajectory recovery
5. Transient time response recovery

Internal stability of the reconfigured closed loop is usually the minimum requirement. The equilibrium recovery goal (also referred to as weak goal) refers to the steady-state output equilibrium which the reconfigured loop reaches after a given constant input. This equilibrium must equal the nominal equilibrium under the same input (as time tends to infinity). This goal ensures steady-state reference tracking after reconfiguration. The output trajectory recovery goal (also referred to as strong goal) is even stricter. It requires that the dynamic response to an input must equal the nominal response at all times. Further restrictions are imposed by the state trajectory recovery goal, which requires that the state trajectory be restored to the nominal case by the reconfiguration under any input.

Usually a combination of goals is pursued in practice, such as the equilibrium-recovery goal with stability.

The question whether or not these or similar goals can be reached for specific faults is addressed by reconfigurability analysis.

== Reconfiguration approaches ==
=== Fault hiding ===
Fault hiding principle. A reconfiguration block is placed between faulty plant and nominal controller. The reconfigured plant behaviour must match the nominal behaviour. Furthermore, the reconfiguration goals are pointed out.

This paradigm aims at keeping the nominal controller in the loop. To this end, a reconfiguration block can be placed between the faulty plant and the nominal controller. Together with the faulty plant, it forms the reconfigured plant. The reconfiguration block has to fulfill the requirement that the behaviour of the reconfigured plant matches the behaviour of the nominal, that is fault-free plant.

=== Linear model following ===
In linear model following, a formal feature of the nominal closed loop is attempted to be recovered. In the classical pseudo-inverse method, the closed loop system matrix $\bar{\mathbf{A}} = \mathbf{A}-\mathbf{B}\mathbf{K}$ of a state-feedback control structure is used. The new controller $\mathbf{K}_f$ is found to approximate $\bar{\mathbf{A}}$ in the sense of an induced matrix norm.

In perfect model following, a dynamic compensator is introduced to allow for the exact recovery of the complete loop behaviour under certain conditions.

In eigenstructure assignment, the nominal closed loop eigenvalues and eigenvectors (the eigenstructure) is recovered to the nominal case after a fault.

=== Optimisation-based control schemes ===
Optimisation control schemes include: linear-quadratic regulator design (LQR), model predictive control (MPC) and eigenstructure assignment methods.

=== Probabilistic approaches ===
Some probabilistic approaches have been developed.

=== Learning control ===
There are learning automata, neural networks, etc.

== Mathematical tools and frameworks ==
The methods by which reconfiguration is achieved differ considerably. The following list gives an overview of mathematical approaches that are commonly used.

- Adaptive control (AC)
- Disturbance decoupling (DD)
- Eigenstructure assignment (EA)
- Gain scheduling (GS)/linear parameter varying (LPV)
- Generalised internal model control (GIMC)
- Intelligent control (IC)
- Linear matrix inequality (LMI)
- Linear-quadratic regulator (LQR)
- Model following (MF)
- Model predictive control (MPC)
- Pseudo-inverse method (PIM)
- Robust control techniques

== See also ==
Prior to control reconfiguration, it must be at least determined whether a fault has occurred (fault detection) and if so, which components are affected (fault isolation). Preferably, a model of the faulty plant should be provided (fault identification). These questions are addressed by fault diagnosis methods.

Fault accommodation is another common approach to achieve fault tolerance. In contrast to control reconfiguration, accommodation is limited to internal controller changes. The sets of signals manipulated and measured by the controller are fixed, which means that the loop cannot be restructured.
