= Black box model of power converter =

The black box model of power converter also called behavior model, is a method of system identification to represent the characteristics of power converter, that is regarded as a black box. There are two types of black box model of power converter - when the model includes the load, it is called terminated model, otherwise un-terminated model. The type of black box model of power converter is chosen based on the goal of modeling. This black box model of power converter could be a tool for filter design of a system integrated with power converters.

To successfully implement a black box model of a power converter, the equivalent circuit of the converter is assumed a-priori, with the assumption that this equivalent circuit remains constant under different operating conditions. The equivalent circuit of the black box model is built by measuring the stimulus/response of the power converter.

Different modeling methods of power converter could be applied in different circumstances. The white box model of power converters is suitable when all the inner components are known, which can be quite difficult due to the complex nature of the power converter. The grey box model combines some features from both, black box model and white box model, when parts of components are known or the relationship between physical elements and equivalent circuit is investigated.

== Assumption ==
Since the power converter consists of power semiconductor device switches, it is a nonlinear and time-variant system. One assumption of black box model of a power converter is that the system is regarded as linear system when the filter is designed properly to avoid saturation and nonlinear effects. Another strong assumption related to the modeling procedure is that the equivalent circuit model is invariant under different operating conditions. Since in the modeling procedures circuit components are determined under different operating conditions.

== Equivalent circuit ==
The expression of a black box model of power converter is the assumed equivalent circuit model (in frequency domain), which could be easily integrated in the circuit of a system in order to facilitate the process of filter design, control system design and pulse-width modulation design. In general, the equivalent circuit contains mainly two parts: active components like voltage/current sources, and passive components like impedance. The process of black box modeling is actually an approach to determine this equivalent circuit for the converter.

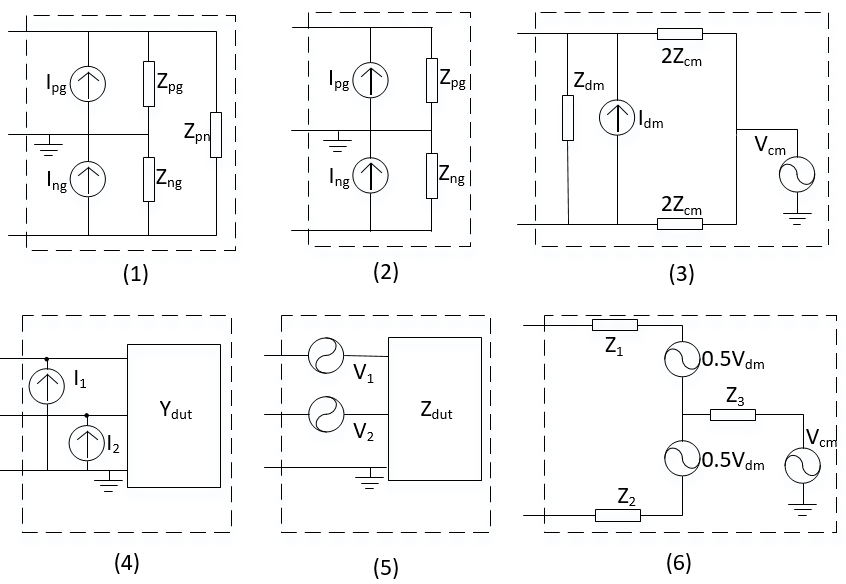
Six equivalent circuits types of power converter's black box model

=== Active components ===
The active components in equivalent circuit are voltage/current sources. They are usually at least two sources, which could be variety options depending on the analysis approach, such as two voltage sources, two current sources, and one voltage and one current source.

=== Passive components ===
The passive components containing resistors, capacitors and inductors can be expressed as combination of several impedances or admittances. Another expression method is to regard the passive components of the power converter as a two-port network and use a Y-matrix or Z-matrix to describe the characteristics of passive components.

== Modeling method ==
Different modeling methods can be utilized to define the equivalent circuit. It depends on the chosen equivalent circuit and the optional measurement techniques. However, many modeling methods need at least one or more assumption mentioned above in order to regard the systems as linear time-invariant system or periodically switched linear system.

=== One example of modeling method ===
This method is based on the two assumptions mentioned in section Assumption, so the system is regarded as linear time-invariant system. Based on these assumptions, the equivalent circuit could be derived from several equations of different operating conditions. The equivalent circuit model is defined containing three impedances and two current sources, where five unknown parameters needs to be determined. Three sets of different operating conditions are built up by changing external impedance and the corresponding currents and voltages at the terminals of the power converter are measured or simulated as known parameters. In each condition, two equations containing five unknown variables could be derived according to Kirchhoff's circuit laws and nodal analysis. In total, six equations could be used to solve these five unknowns and the equivalent circuit could be determined in this way.

=== Other methods to determine passive elements ===
There are many methods used to determine passive elements. The conventional method is to switch off the power converter and measure the impedance with an impedance analyzer, or measure the scattering parameters by a vector network analyzer and compute the impedance afterwards. These conventional methods assume that the impedances of power converter is the same in the operating condition and switched-off condition.

Many state-of-art methods are investigated to measure the impedance when the power converter is in operating condition. One method is to put two clamp-on current probes in the system, in which one is called receiving probe and another is injecting probe. The output of two probes are connected on a vector network analyzer, the impedance of power converter is measured after some calibration procedures in CM and DM measurement setups. This method is restricted with its delicate calibration procedure.

Another state-of-art method is to utilize a transformer and an impedance analyzer in two different setups in order to measure CM and DM impedance separately. The measurement range of this method is limited by the characteristics of the transformer.

== See also ==
- black box
- grey box model
- system identification
- nonlinear system identification
- linear time-invariant system
- time-variant system
- nonlinear system
