= Obfuscation =

Unclear communication

Obfuscation is the obscuring of the intended meaning of communication by making the message difficult to understand, usually with confusing and ambiguous language. The obfuscation might be either unintentional or intentional (although intent usually is connoted), and is accomplished with circumlocution (talking around the subject), the use of jargon (technical language of a profession), and the use of an argot (ingroup language) of limited communicative value to outsiders.

In expository writing, unintentional obfuscation usually occurs in draft documents, at the beginning of composition; such obfuscation is illuminated with critical thinking and editorial revision, either by the writer or by an editor. Etymologically, the word obfuscation derives from the Latin obfuscatio, from obfuscāre (to darken); synonyms include the words beclouding and abstrusity.

== Medical ==
Doctors are faulted for using jargon to conceal unpleasant facts from a patient; the American author and physician Michael Crichton said that medical writing is a "highly skilled, calculated attempt to confuse the reader". The psychologist B. F. Skinner said that medical notation is a form of multiple audience control, which allows the doctor to communicate to the pharmacist things which the patient might oppose if they could understand medical jargon.

== Eschew ==
"Eschew obfuscation", also stated as "eschew obfuscation, espouse elucidation", is a humorous fumblerule used by English teachers and professors when lecturing about proper writing techniques. Literally, the phrase means "avoid being unclear" or "avoid being unclear, support being clear", but the use of relatively uncommon words causes confusion in much of the audience (those lacking the vocabulary), making the statement an example of irony, and more precisely a heterological phrase. The phrase has appeared in print at least as early as 1959, when it was used as a section heading in a NASA document.

An earlier similar phrase appears in Mark Twain's Fenimore Cooper's Literary Offenses, where he lists rule fourteen of good writing as "eschew surplusage".

== Secure communication ==
Obfuscation of oral or written communication achieves a degree of secure communication without a need to rely upon technology. This technique is sometimes referred to as "talking around" and is a form of security through obscurity.

A notable example of obfuscation of written communication is a message sent by September 11 attacks ringleader Mohamed Atta to other conspirators prior to the attacks occurring:

The semester begins in three more weeks. We've obtained 19 confirmations for studies in the faculty of law, the faculty of urban planning, the faculty of fine arts and the faculty of engineering.

— Mohamed Atta

In this obfuscated message, the following code words are believed to exist:

- "semester" refers to planned September 11 attacks
- "19 confirmations" refers to the Hijackers in the September 11 attacks
- "faculty of law" refers to a target, the United States Capitol
- "faculty of urban planning" refers to a target, the World Trade Center
- "faculty of fine arts" refers to a target, the White House
- "faculty of engineering" refers to a target, The Pentagon

Within the illegal drug trade, obfuscation is commonly used in communication to hide the occurrence of drug trafficking. A common spoken example is "420", used as a code word for cannabis, a drug which, despite some recent prominent decriminalization changes, remains illegal in most places. The Drug Enforcement Administration reported in July 2018 a total of 353 different code words used for cannabis.

== Software ==
Software obfuscation is the process of deliberately making code difficult to understand without changing its behaviour. This is often done to protect intellectual property and prevent reverse engineering (e.g. in anti-cheat and malware).

== White box cryptography ==
Black box systems

System
- Black box, Oracle machine

Methods and techniques
- Black-box testing, Blackboxing

Related techniques
- Feed forward, Obfuscation, Pattern recognition, White box, White-box testing, Gray-box testing, System identification

Fundamentals
- A priori information, Control systems, Open systems, Operations research, Thermodynamic systems

In white-box cryptography, obfuscation refers to the protection of cryptographic keys from extraction when they are under the control of the adversary, e.g., as part of a DRM scheme.

== Network security ==
In network security, obfuscation refers to methods used to obscure an attack payload from inspection by network protection systems.

== In popular culture ==
- In Animal Farm, the pigs such as Squealer and Napoleon use obfuscation to confuse the other animals with doublespeak in order to prevent any uprisings.
- In the British Sitcom Yes Minister, the character Sir Humphrey Appleby often uses obfuscation for comedic effect while trying to confuse and prevent Jim Hacker from taking charge.

== See also ==
- Black box
- Cant (language)
- Code word (figure of speech)
- Doublespeak
- Fallacy of quoting out of context
- Fuzzy concept
- Jargon
- Mind games
- Obscurantism
- Plain English
- Politics and the English Language
- Propaganda
- Steganography
- Verbosity
