= Gray-box testing =

Software testing

Black box systems

System
- Black box, Oracle machine

Methods and techniques
- Black-box testing, Blackboxing

Related techniques
- Feed forward, Obfuscation, Pattern recognition, White box, White-box testing, Gray-box testing, System identification

Fundamentals
- A priori information, Control systems, Open systems, Operations research, Thermodynamic systems

Gray-box testing is a software testing method used to search for defects due to improper structure or application usage, where the tester has partial knowledge of the internal structure of the software. It is a combination of white-box testing, where the tester has broad access to the internal structure of the application, and black-box testing, where tester is unaware of the structure.

The knowledge available to gray-box testers may comprise both high-level and detailed documentation, such as software architecture, Unified Modeling Language (UML) models, Web Services Description Language (WSDL) information and state models. Testing tools and techniques include exception handling, regression testing, functional testing, and orthogonal array testing.

Gray-box testing is particularly used for testing web applications, that have distributed networks, and no source code or binaries that would allow for white box testing.

== See also ==
- Grey box model
