= Blackboxing =

Social process in science studies

Black box systems

System
- Black box, Oracle machine

Methods and techniques
- Black-box testing, Blackboxing

Related techniques
- Feed forward, Obfuscation, Pattern recognition, White box, White-box testing, Gray-box testing, System identification

Fundamentals
- A priori information, Control systems, Open systems, Operations research, Thermodynamic systems

In science studies, the social process of blackboxing is based on the abstract notion of a black box. To cite Bruno Latour, blackboxing is "the way scientific and technical work is made invisible by its own success. When a machine runs efficiently, when a matter of fact is settled, one need focus only on its inputs and outputs and not on its internal complexity. Thus, paradoxically, the more science and technology succeed, the more opaque and obscure they become."

== Overview ==
Social constructivist approaches to science and technology studies, such as social construction of technology (SCOT) often revolve around "opening the black box", or attempting to understand the internal workings of a given system. This allows the investigator to find what empirical models of technical change explain the specific events forming the technology. The social constructivist conception of black boxing doesn't delineate the physical components hidden inside an apparent whole; rather, what is black-boxed are associations, various actors from which the box is composed. Opening the hood of an electric car, for example, reveals only mechanical components. Batteries, communicators, and other specialized parts become apparent. Social constructivists "opening" the black box of an electric car would find Tesla and lithium mining. Another example of blackboxing in modern society is Uber's pricing system. Users of the ride share app don't know what causes prices to appear as they are, they are just expected to assume that there is a valid reason for any given price.

The concept of the black box is also important in actor–network theory as it relates to simplification. As Michel Callon notes, an actor-network is a system of discrete entities or nodes, while the reality that it represents is theoretically infinite. Therefore, in order to describe something in terms of an actor-network, complex systems must be simplified down to individual nodes, ignoring their internal workings and focusing only on their interactions with other nodes within the network. However, if the simplified "black box" insufficiently models the system in question, it must be opened, creating a "swarm of new actors."

Theorist Clay Spinuzzi points out that this simplification creates problems when “opening” a black box if a breakdown occurs. Investigating a malfunctioning black box would then mean checking each individual node of a system that once appeared as a singular whole. ”Instead of the simple inputs and outputs that some activity theorists have envisioned linking the component activity systems,” Spinuzzi writes, “those systems overlap, blur, and interact in unpredictable and unstable ways”. Spinuzzi notes that in most cases self-regulating black boxes can't propagate because the opaque internal work is too extempore and ad hoc to work on a broad scale.

Black-boxing as an approach has been criticized by scholars such as Langdon Winner for being excessively formulaic in method and too narrow in focus. R.H. Lossin also critiques black-boxes as a transposition of Marx's use-value, where the ‘dead labor’ embedded into objects is transformed into a Latourean conception of neutral inputs and outputs. Lossin sees the narrative of black boxes as something that foregrounds human and sociological activity into a mere backdrop. This reading finds any class discrepancy reduced to a flat and unending web of technical entanglements.

== See also ==
- Blinded experiment
