= Closed system (control theory) =

The terms closed system and open system have long been defined in the widely (and long before any sort of amplifier was invented) established subject of thermodynamics, in terms that have nothing to do with the concepts of feedback and feedforward. The terms 'feedforward' and 'feedback' arose first in the 1920s in the theory of amplifier design, more recently than the thermodynamic terms. Negative feedback was eventually patented by H.S Black in 1934. In thermodynamics, an open system is one that can take in and give out ponderable matter. In thermodynamics, a closed system is one that cannot take in or give out ponderable matter, but may be able to take in or give out radiation and heat and work or any form of energy. In thermodynamics, a closed system can be further restricted, by being 'isolated': an isolated system cannot take in nor give out either ponderable matter or any form of energy. It does not make sense to try to use these well established terms to try to distinguish the presence or absence of feedback in a control system.

The theory of control systems leaves room for systems with both feedforward pathways and feedback elements or pathways. The terms 'feedforward' and 'feedback' refer to elements or paths within a system, not to a system as a whole. THE input to the system comes from outside it, as energy from the signal source by way of some possibly leaky or noisy path. Part of the output of a system can be compounded, with the intermediacy of a feedback path, in some way such as addition or subtraction, with a signal derived from the system input, to form a 'return balance signal' that is input to a PART of the system to form a feedback loop within the system. (It is not correct to say that part of the output of a system can be used as THE input to the system.)

There can be feedforward paths within the system in parallel with one or more of the feedback loops of the system so that the system output is a compound of the outputs of the feedback loops and of the parallel feedforward paths. Feedforward and feedback often occur in one and the same system. It makes sense to speak of a control system only if it contains at least one feedforward path; the presence or absence of feedback is contingent.

A feedback loop needs within itself both a feedforward element and a feedback element. For example, the feedforward element (for example a transistor) in an amplifier has access to a controlled power reservoir and provides power gain for the loop and is therefore called an active element. The feedback element is often, but not always, passive (for example a resistor). It makes sense to speak of a feedback loop only when referring to a loop with a well-defined active feedforward element. Without this, a loop does not have a definite sense (clockwise or anti-clockwise) of signal circulation by which one could distinguish its feedforward and feedback elements. Without this definite sense of signal circulation one is looking at a mere mesh in a network, and it makes no sense to speak of a feedback loop.

A feedback loop can contain further feedback loops within itself, or it can provide a pathway inside another feedback loop, provided its 'input' and 'output' are defined.

A 1993 paper, General Systems Theory by David S. Walonick, Ph.D., states in part, "A closed system is one where interactions occur only among the system components and not with the environment. An open system is one that receives input from the environment and/or releases output to the environment. The basic characteristics of an open system is the dynamic interaction of its components, while the basis of a cybernetic model is the feedback cycle. Open systems can tend toward higher levels of organization (negative entropy), while closed systems can only maintain or decrease in organization."

== See also ==
- Open system (control theory)
