= Weighting pattern =

Pattern in control theory

A weighting pattern for a linear dynamical system describes the relationship between an input $u$ and output $y$. Given the time-variant system described by

$$\dot{x}(t) = A(t)x(t) + B(t)u(t)$$
$$y(t) = C(t)x(t)$$,

then the output can be written as

$$y(t) = y(t_0) + \int_{t_0}^t T(t,\sigma)u(\sigma) d\sigma$$,

where $T(\cdot,\cdot)$ is the weighting pattern for the system. For such a system, the weighting pattern is $T(t,\sigma) = C(t)\phi(t,\sigma)B(\sigma)$ such that $\phi$ is the state transition matrix.

The weighting pattern will determine a system, but if there exists a realization for this weighting pattern then there exist many that do so.

== Linear time invariant system ==
In a LTI system then the weighting pattern is:

Continuous
$$T(t,\sigma) = C e^{A(t-\sigma)} B$$

where $e^{A(t-\sigma)}$ is the matrix exponential.

Discrete
$$T(k,l) = C A^{k-l-1} B$$.

== See also ==
- Control theory
