= Black box group =

In computational group theory, a black box group (black-box group) is a group G whose elements are encoded by bit strings of length N, and group operations are performed by an oracle (the "black box"). These operations include:

- taking a product g·h of elements g and h,
- taking an inverse g^{−1} of element g,
- deciding whether g = 1.

This class is defined to include both the permutation groups and the matrix groups. The upper bound on the order of G given by |G| ≤ 2^{N} shows that G is finite.

== Applications ==
The black box groups were introduced by Babai and Szemerédi in 1984. They were used as a formalism for (constructive) group recognition and property testing. Notable algorithms include the Babai's algorithm for finding random group elements, the Product Replacement Algorithm, and testing group commutativity.

Many early algorithms in CGT, such as the Schreier–Sims algorithm, require a permutation representation of a group and thus are not black box. Many other algorithms require finding element orders. Since there are efficient ways of finding the order of an element in a permutation group or in a matrix group (a method for the latter is described by Celler and Leedham-Green in 1997), a common recourse is to assume that the black box group is equipped with a further oracle for determining element orders.

== See also ==
- Implicit graph
- Matroid oracle
