= Frequency domain decomposition =

The frequency domain decomposition (FDD) is an output-only system identification technique popular in civil engineering, in particular in structural health monitoring. As an output-only algorithm, it is useful when the input data is unknown. FDD is a modal analysis technique which generates a system realization using the frequency response given (multi-)output data.

== Algorithm ==
1. Estimate the power spectral density matrix $\hat{G}_{yy}(j\omega)$ at discrete frequencies $\omega = \omega_i$.
2. Do a singular value decomposition of the power spectral density, i.e. $\hat{G}_{yy}(j \omega_i) = U_i S_i U_i^H$ where $U_i = [u_{i1},u_{i2},...,u_{im}]$ is a unitary matrix holding the singular vectors $u_{ij}$, $S_i$ is the diagonal matrix holding the singular values $s_{ij}$.
3. For an $n$ degree of freedom system, then pick the $n$ dominating peaks in the power spectral density using whichever technique you wish (or manually). These peaks correspond to the mode shapes.
  1. Using the mode shapes, an input-output system realization can be written.

== See also ==
- Eigensystem realization algorithm - an input/output identification technique
