= White box (software engineering) =

System whose internals can be viewed but not altered

Black box systems

System
- Black box, Oracle machine

Methods and techniques
- Black-box testing, Blackboxing

Related techniques
- Feed forward, Obfuscation, Pattern recognition, White box, White-box testing, Gray-box testing, System identification

Fundamentals
- A priori information, Control systems, Open systems, Operations research, Thermodynamic systems

A white box (or glass box, clear box, or open box) is a subsystem whose internals can be viewed but usually not altered. The term is used in systems engineering, software engineering, and in intelligent user interface design, where it is closely related to recent interest in explainable artificial intelligence.

Having access to the subsystem internals in general makes the subsystem easier to understand, but also easier to hack; for example, if a programmer can examine source code, weaknesses in an algorithm are much easier to discover. That makes white-box testing much more effective than black-box testing but considerably more difficult from the sophistication needed on the part of the tester to understand the subsystem.

The notion of a "Black Box in a Glass Box" was originally used as a metaphor for teaching complex topics to computing novices.

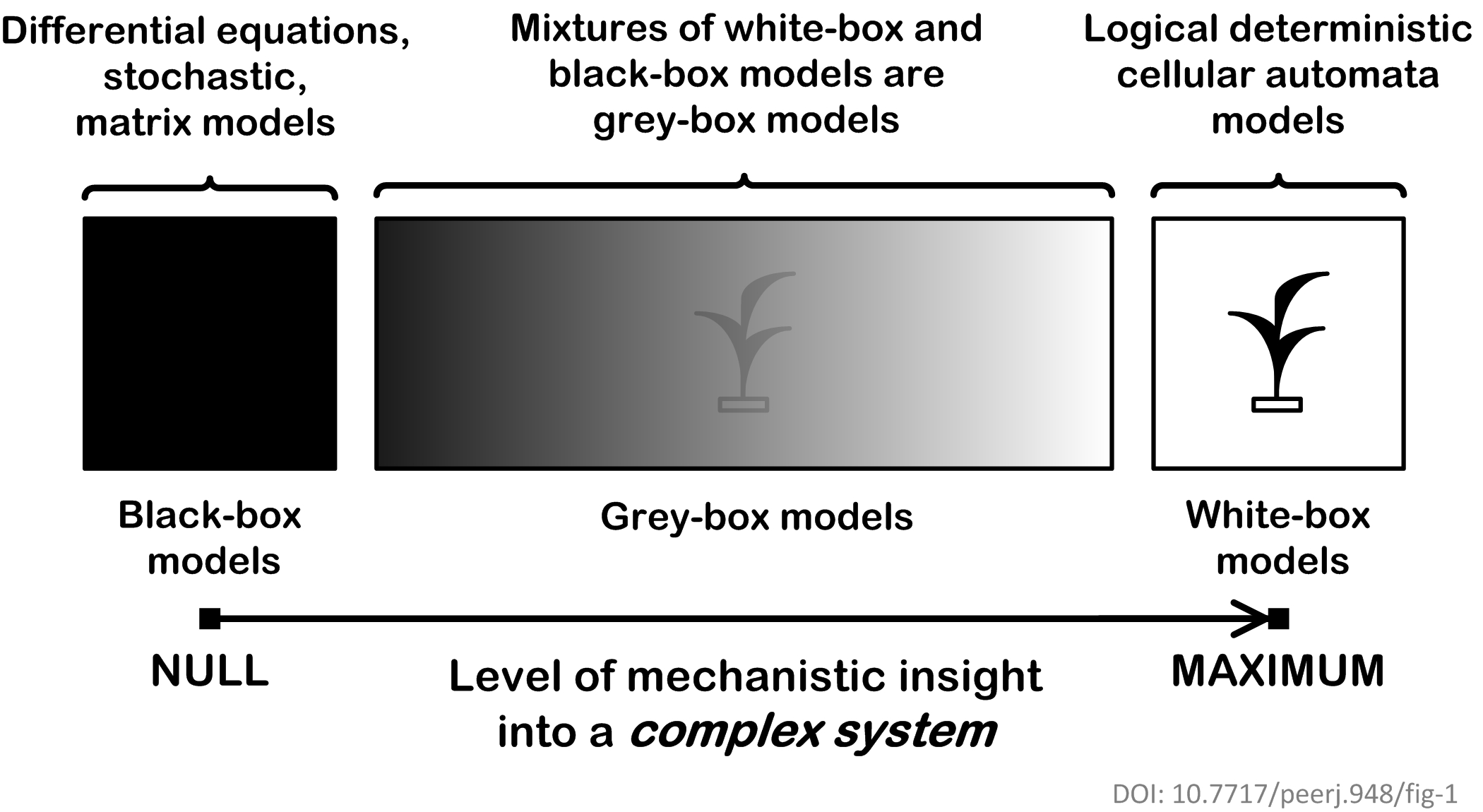
Mathematical models for complex systems

== See also ==
- Black box
- Gray-box testing
