= Subspace identification method =

Mathematical concept

In mathematics, specifically in control theory, subspace identification (SID) aims at identifying linear time invariant (LTI) state space models from input-output data. SID does not require that the user parametrizes the system matrices before solving a parametric optimization problem and, as a consequence, SID methods do not suffer from problems related to local minima that often lead to unsatisfactory identification results.

== History ==
SID methods are rooted in the work by the German mathematician Leopold Kronecker (1823–1891). Kronecker showed that a power series can be written as a rational function when the rank of the Hankel operator that has the power series as its symbol is finite. The rank determines the order of the polynomials of the rational function.

In the 1960s the work of Kronecker inspired a number of researchers in the area of Systems and Control, like Ho and Kalman, Silverman and Youla and Tissi, to store the Markov parameters of an LTI system into a finite dimensional Hankel matrix and derive from this matrix an (A,B,C) realization of the LTI system. The key observation was that when the Hankel matrix is properly dimensioned versus the order of the LTI system, the rank of the Hankel matrix is the order of the LTI system and the SVD of the Hankel matrix provides a basis of the column space observability matrix and row space of the controllability matrix of the LTI system. Knowledge of this key spaces allows to estimate the system matrices via linear least squares.

An extension to the stochastic realization problem where we have knowledge only of the Auto-correlation (covariance) function of the output of an LTI system driven by white noise, was derived by researchers like Akaike.

A second generation of SID methods attempted to make SID methods directly operate on input-output measurements of the LTI system in the decade 1985–1995. One such generalization was presented under the name of the Eigensystem Realization Algorithm (ERA) made use of specific input-output measurements considering the impulse inputs. It has been used for modal analysis of flexible structures, like bridges, space structures, etc. These methods have demonstrated to work in practice for resonant structures they did not work well for other type of systems and an input different from an impulse. A new impulse to the development of SID methods was made for operating directly on generic input-output data and avoiding to first explicitly compute the Markov parameters or estimating the samples of covariance functions prior to realizing the system matrices. Pioneers that contributed to these breakthroughs were Van Overschee and De Moor – introducing the N4SID approach, Verhaegen – introducing the MOESP approach and Larimore – presenting ST in the framework of Canonical Variate Analysis (CVA)
