= Franz Breisig =

German mathematician

- Born: April 19, 1868; Elberfeld, Germany
- Died: 1934 (aged 65–66); Berlin, Germany
- Known for: Quadripole circuit analysis
- Scientific career
- Fields: Mathematics

Franz Breisig (1868–1934) was a German mathematician, chiefly known for his work on quadripoles (1921), later to be known as two-port networks.

== Publications ==
- Breisig, Dr F, Theoretische Telegraphie, Braunschweig, F. Vieweg und Sohn, 1910.

== Patents ==
- Breisig, F, Method and Arrangement for Determining Crosstalk in Multicircuit Systems, US patent 492 034, filed 13 Aug 1921, issued 30 Jun 1925

== See also ==
- Black box
