= Realization (systems) =

In systems theory

In systems theory, a realization of a state space model is an implementation of a given input-output behavior. That is, given an input-output relationship, a realization is a quadruple of (time-varying) matrices $[A(t),B(t),C(t),D(t)]$ such that

$$\dot{\mathbf{x}}(t) = A(t) \mathbf{x}(t) + B(t) \mathbf{u}(t)$$
$$\mathbf{y}(t) = C(t) \mathbf{x}(t) + D(t) \mathbf{u}(t)$$

with $(u(t),y(t))$ describing the input and output of the system at time $t$.

== LTI System ==
For a linear time-invariant system specified by a transfer matrix, $H(s)$, a realization is any quadruple of matrices $(A,B,C,D)$ such that $H(s) = C(sI-A)^{-1}B+D$.

=== Canonical realizations ===
Any given transfer function which is strictly proper can easily be transferred into state-space by the following approach (this example is for a 4-dimensional, single-input, single-output system)):

Given a transfer function, expand it to reveal all coefficients in both the numerator and denominator. This should result in the following form:

$$H(s) = \frac{n_{3}s^{3} + n_{2}s^{2} + n_{1}s + n_{0}}{s^{4} + d_{3}s^{3} + d_{2}s^{2} + d_{1}s + d_{0}}$$.

The coefficients can now be inserted directly into the state-space model by the following approach:

$$\dot{\textbf{x}}(t) = \begin{bmatrix}
-d_{3}& -d_{2}& -d_{1}& -d_{0}\\
1&      0&      0&      0\\
0&      1&      0&      0\\
0&      0&      1&      0
\end{bmatrix}\textbf{x}(t) +
\begin{bmatrix} 1\\ 0\\ 0\\ 0\\ \end{bmatrix}\textbf{u}(t)$$

$$\textbf{y}(t) = \begin{bmatrix} n_{3}& n_{2}& n_{1}& n_{0} \end{bmatrix}\textbf{x}(t)$$.

This state-space realization is called controllable canonical form (also known as phase variable canonical form) because the resulting model is guaranteed to be controllable (i.e., because the control enters a chain of integrators, it has the ability to move every state).

The transfer function coefficients can also be used to construct another type of canonical form

$$\dot{\textbf{x}}(t) = \begin{bmatrix}
-d_{3}&   1&  0&  0\\
-d_{2}&   0&  1&  0\\
-d_{1}&   0&  0&  1\\
-d_{0}&   0&  0&  0
\end{bmatrix}\textbf{x}(t) +
\begin{bmatrix} n_{3}\\ n_{2}\\ n_{1}\\ n_{0} \end{bmatrix}\textbf{u}(t)$$

$$\textbf{y}(t) = \begin{bmatrix} 1& 0& 0& 0 \end{bmatrix}\textbf{x}(t)$$.

This state-space realization is called observable canonical form because the resulting model is guaranteed to be observable (i.e., because the output exits from a chain of integrators, every state has an effect on the output).

== General System ==
=== D = 0 ===
If we have an input $u(t)$, an output $y(t)$, and a weighting pattern $T(t,\sigma)$ then a realization is any triple of matrices $[A(t),B(t),C(t)]$ such that $T(t,\sigma) = C(t) \phi(t,\sigma) B(\sigma)$ where $\phi$ is the state-transition matrix associated with the realization.

== System identification ==
System identification techniques take the experimental data from a system and output a realization. Such techniques can utilize both input and output data (e.g. eigensystem realization algorithm) or can only include the output data (e.g. frequency domain decomposition). Typically an input-output technique would be more accurate, but the input data is not always available.

== See also ==
- Grey box model
- Statistical model
- System identification
