= Open system (systems theory) =

Systems with external interactions

Open systems have input and output flows, representing exchanges of matter, energy or information with its surroundings.

An open system (also known as a flow system) is a system that has external interactions. Such interactions can take the form of information, energy, or material transfers into or out of the system boundary, depending on the discipline which defines the concept. An open system is contrasted with the concept of an isolated system which exchanges neither energy, matter, nor information with its environment. A viable open system exchanges energy, matter, and/or information with its surroundings through semi-permeable, regulated, or established boundaries that preserve identity while enabling adaptive flow.

The concept of an open system was formalized within a framework that enabled one to interrelate the theory of the organism, thermodynamics, and evolutionary theory. This concept was expanded upon with the advent of information theory and subsequently systems theory. Today the concept has its applications in the natural and social sciences.

Properties of isolated, closed, and open systems in exchanging energy and matter.

In the natural sciences an open system is one whose border is permeable to both energy and mass. By contrast, a closed system is permeable to energy but not to matter.

The definition of an open system assumes that there are supplies of energy that cannot be depleted; in practice, this energy is supplied from some source in the surrounding environment, which can be treated as infinite for the purposes of study. One type of open system is the radiant energy system, which receives its energy from solar radiation – an energy source that can be regarded as inexhaustible for all practical purposes.

== Social sciences ==
In the social sciences an open system is a process that exchanges material, energy, people, capital and information with its environment. French/Greek philosopher Kostas Axelos argued that seeing the "world system" as inherently open (though unified) would solve many of the problems in the social sciences, including that of praxis (the relation of knowledge to practice), so that various social scientific disciplines would work together rather than create monopolies whereby the world appears only sociological, political, historical, or psychological. Axelos argues that theorizing a closed system contributes to making it closed, and is thus a conservative approach. The Althusserian concept of overdetermination (drawing on Sigmund Freud) posits that there are always multiple causes in every event.

David Harvey uses this to argue that when systems such as capitalism enter a phase of crisis, it can happen through one of a number of elements, such as gender roles, the relation to nature/the environment, or crises in accumulation. Looking at the crisis in accumulation, Harvey argues that phenomena such as foreign direct investment, privatization of state-owned resources, and accumulation by dispossession act as necessary outlets when capital has overaccumulated too much in private hands and cannot circulate effectively in the marketplace. He cites the forcible displacement of Mexican and Indian peasants since the 1970s and the 1997 Asian financial crisis, involving "hedge fund raising" of national currencies, as examples of this.

Structural functionalists such as Talcott Parsons and neofunctionalists such as Niklas Luhmann have incorporated system theory to describe society and its components.

The sociology of religion finds both open and closed systems within the field of religion.

== See also ==
- Business process
- Complex system
- Dynamical system
- Glossary of systems theory
- Ludwig von Bertalanffy
- Maximum power principle
- Non-equilibrium thermodynamics
- Open system (computing)
- Open System Environment Reference Model
- Openness
- Phantom loop
- Thermodynamic system
