= Open loop (disambiguation) =

An open loop or open-loop controller is a control loop or controller that has an absence of feedback.

It may also refer to:

- Open-loop model, a model studied in game theory in which players cannot observe the actions of other players

== See also ==
- Control system, a system for controlling a signal or process that may operate with an open or closed feedback loop
- Control theory, the theory of control systems, which involves the analysis of feedback loops
- Feedback, the effect of having the output of a system affect its input and thus have an effect on its subsequent output
- Process control, the control of processes, typically involving feedback loops
