= Sampled data system =

In systems science, a sampled-data system is a control system in which a continuous-time plant is controlled with a digital device. Under periodic sampling, the sampled-data system is time-varying but also periodic; thus, it may be modeled by a simplified discrete-time system obtained by discretizing the plant. However, this discrete model does not capture the inter-sample behavior of the real system, which may be critical in a number of applications.

The analysis of sampled-data systems incorporating full-time information leads to challenging control problems with a rich mathematical structure. Many of these problems have only been solved recently.
