= Control loading system =

Aerospace system

A Control Loading System (CLS, also known as Electric Control Loading), is used to provide pilots with realistic flight control forces in a flight simulator or training device. These are used in both commercial and military training applications.

== History ==
The history of control loading systems starts with the history of flight simulation. The first flight simulator was the Link Trainer, also known as the Blue Box. This was developed in the 1920s and used pumps, valves and bellows to provide the flight control forces. The next development in control loading systems was the use of hydraulic actuators to provide the forces required on the flight controls. These were utilized for around 20 years in the simulator industry until the development of electric actuators.

== Control Loading Systems ==
=== Design and Technology ===
The main concept is to provide forces to the pilot using an actuator (hydraulic or electric). The approach used in high fidelity applications is to connect this actuator via a linkage to the pilot controls. The actuator is then controlled with a servo controller to control the torque or current of the motor. An outer-loop control then controls the torque provided to the pilot using a control loop around a force sensor.

The control loading system must take in inputs from the simulator and pilot and provide outputs for the pilot and simulator. Inputs are application of force and aircraft states and outputs are flight control position and forces. An aircraft with reversible controls needs to have all of the complex components modeled within the control loading system. These include cables, rods, aero forces from the control surface, centering springs and trim actuators. As the control system gets more complicated they have to simulate effects such as bob-weights and feel units. Fly-by-wire systems are disconnected from the control surfaces and so do not need the complex features but add other functionality which is simulated. The high fidelity architecture has centralized control, individual analog signals to the control module, a brushless DC motor with low gear ratio and linkages to the pilot controls. The modular designs have localized control and digital reporting over a field bus to the central control module. The control loading systems are designed to allow situating the actuators closer to the pilot. This is necessary for mission training systems that can be easily deployed and moved around the world.

Control Loading Systems are similar in design to active sidesticks. These provide cues to pilots during the flight via actuation systems. Some examples of active sidesticks used in aircraft are for the F-35 Lightning II and the T-50 Golden Eagle jet trainer developed by KAI in partnership with Lockheed Martin Corporation.

=== Standards and Regulations ===
The regulations governing control loading systems for civil simulators are the Federal Aviation Administration regulations in North America and EASA (formerly JAA) in Europe. The FAA documents are 14 CFR part 60 for airplane and helicopter flight simulator training device qualification. The EASA regulations are similar to the FAR's. Between 2006 and 2008 the International Working Group of the RAeS's Flight Simulation Group met on several occasions to redefine the standards applicable to flight simulation. This resulted in the release of a draft standards document to ICAO. This will be released by ICAO in 2009 and at this time the FAA and EASA should incorporate this into the regulations. The changes behind the standards will define different levels of simulator training devices which define what training requirements can be trained on with particular levels of simulators.
