= Control loop =

Fundamental building block of control systems

A control loop is the fundamental building block of control systems in general and industrial control systems in particular. It consists of the process sensor, the controller function, and the final control element (FCE) which controls the process necessary to automatically adjust the value of a measured process variable (PV) to equal the value of a desired set-point (SP).

== Open-loop and closed-loop ==
Fundamentally, there are two types of control loop: open-loop control (feedforward), and closed-loop control (feedback).

- In open-loop control, the control action from the controller is independent of the "process output" (or "controlled process variable"). A good example of this is a central heating boiler controlled only by a timer, so that heat is applied for a constant time, regardless of the temperature of the building. The control action is the switching on/off of the boiler. The controlled variable should be the building temperature, but is not because this is an open-loop control of the boiler, which does not give closed-loop control of the temperature.
- In closed loop control, the control action from the controller is dependent on the process output, so the desired and actual process variable. In the case of the boiler analogy, this would include a thermostat to monitor the building temperature, and thereby feed back a signal to ensure the controller maintains the building at the temperature set on the thermostat. A closed loop controller therefore has a feedback loop which ensures the controller exerts a control action to give a process output the same as the "reference input" or "set point". For this reason, closed loop controllers are also called feedback controllers.

The definition of a closed loop control system according to the British Standards Institution is "a control system possessing monitoring feedback, the deviation signal formed as a result of this feedback being used to control the action of a final control element in such a way as to tend to reduce the deviation to zero."

Likewise; "A Feedback Control System is a system which tends to maintain a prescribed relationship of one system variable to another by comparing functions of these variables and using the difference as a means of control."

=== Other examples ===
A block diagram of a negative feedback control system using a feedback loop to control the process variable by comparing it with a desired value, and applying the difference as an error signal to generate a control output to reduce or eliminate the error

An example of a control system is a car's cruise control, which is a device designed to maintain vehicle speed at a constant desired or reference speed provided by the driver. The controller is the cruise control, the plant is the car, and the system is the car and the cruise control. The system output is the car's speed, and the control itself is the engine's throttle position which determines how much power the engine delivers.

A primitive way to implement cruise control is simply to lock the throttle position when the driver engages cruise control. However, if the cruise control is engaged on a stretch of non-flat road, then the car will travel slower going uphill and faster when going downhill. This type of controller is called an open-loop controller because there is no feedback; no measurement of the system output (the car's speed) is used to alter the control (the throttle position.) As a result, the controller cannot compensate for changes acting on the car, like a change in the slope of the road.

In a closed-loop control system, data from a sensor monitoring the car's speed (the system output) enters a controller which continuously compares the quantity representing the speed with the reference quantity representing the desired speed. The difference, called the error, determines the throttle position (the control). The result is to match the car's speed to the reference speed (maintain the desired system output). Now, when the car goes uphill, the difference between the input (the sensed speed) and the reference continuously determines the throttle position. As the sensed speed drops below the reference, the difference increases, the throttle opens, and engine power increases, speeding up the vehicle. In this way, the controller dynamically counteracts changes to the car's speed. The central idea of these control systems is the feedback loop, the controller affects the system output, which in turn is measured and fed back to the controller.

== Application ==
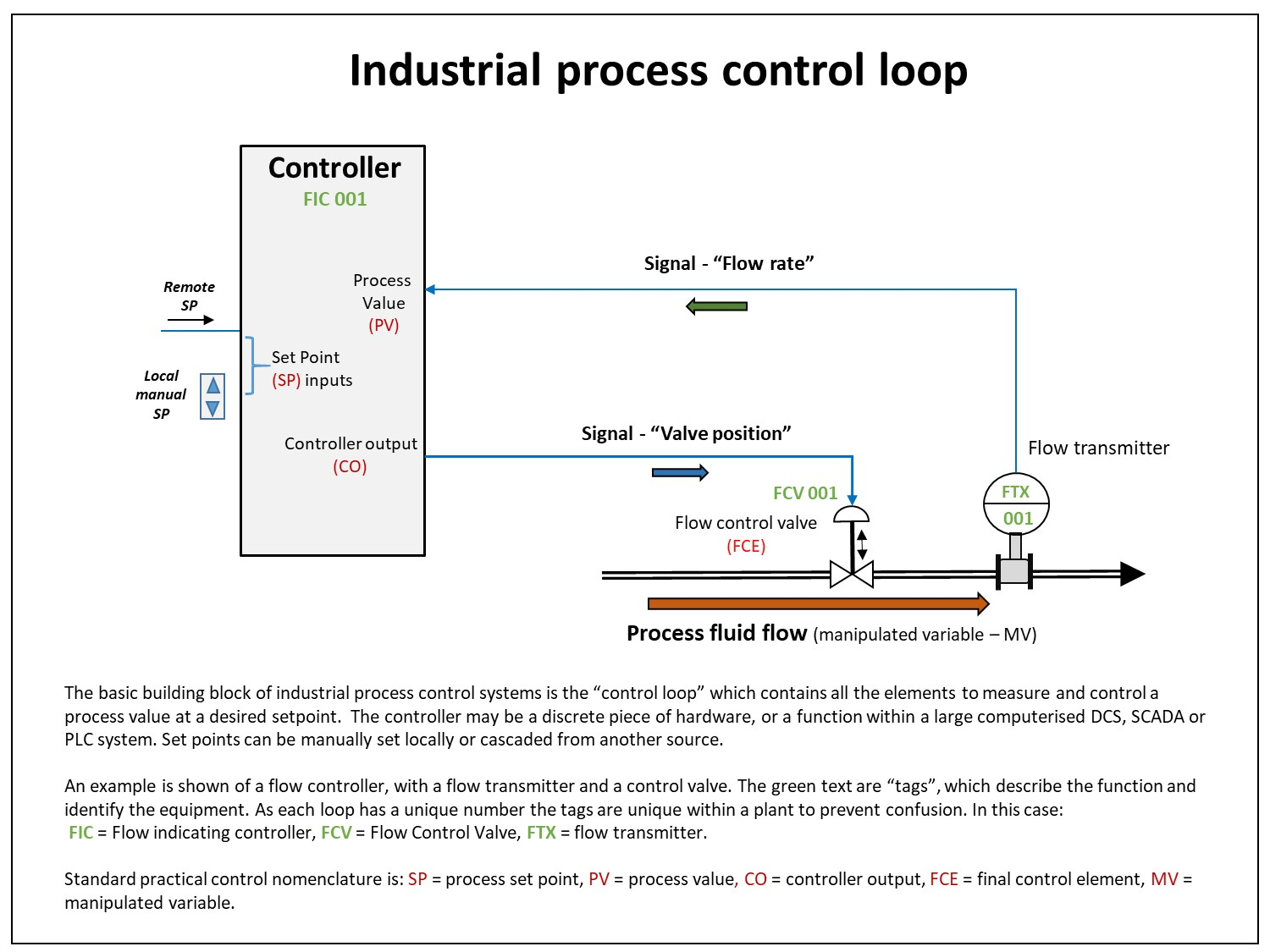
Example of a single industrial control loop; showing continuously modulated control of process flow.

The accompanying diagram shows a control loop with a single PV input, a control function, and the control output (CO) which modulates the action of the final control element (FCE) to alter the value of the manipulated variable (MV). In this example, a flow control loop is shown, but can be level, temperature, or any one of many process parameters which need to be controlled. The control function shown is an "intermediate type" such as a PID controller which means it can generate a full range of output signals anywhere between 0-100%, rather than just an on/off signal.

In this example, the value of the PV is always the same as the MV, as they are in series in the pipeline. However, if the feed from the valve was to a tank, and the controller function was to control the level using the fill valve, the PV would be the tank level, and the MV would be the flow to the tank.

The controller function can be a discrete controller or a function block in a computerised control system such as a distributed control system or a programmable logic controller. In all cases, a control loop diagram is a very convenient and useful way of representing the control function and its interaction with plant. In practice at a process control level, control loops are normally abbreviated using standard symbols in a Piping and instrumentation diagram, which shows all elements of the process measurement and control based on a process flow diagram.

At a detailed level, the control loop connection diagram is created to show the electrical and pneumatic connections. This greatly aids diagnostics and repair, as all the connections for a single control function are on one diagram.

== Loop and control equipment tagging ==
To aid unique identification of equipment, each loop and its elements are identified by a "tagging" system and each element has a unique tag identification.

Based on the standards ANSI/ISA S5.1 and ISO 14617-6, the identifications consist of up to 5 letters.

The first identification letter is for the measured value, the second is a modifier, 3rd indicates the passive/readout function, 4th - active/output function, and the 5th is the function modifier. This is followed by loop number, which is unique to that loop.

For instance, FIC045 means it is the Flow Indicating Controller in control loop 045. This is also known as the "tag" identifier of the field device, which is normally given to the location and function of the instrument. The same loop may have FT045 - which is the flow transmitter in the same loop.

Letter	Column 1 Measured value	Column 2 Modifier	Column 3 Readout/passive function	Column 4 Output/active function	Column 5 Function modifier
A	Analysis		Alarm		
B	Burner, combustion		User choice	User choice	User choice
C	User's choice - usually conductivity			Control	Close
D	User's choice - usually density	Difference			Deviation
E	Voltage		Sensor		
F	Flow rate	Ratio			
G	User's choice (usually gaging/gauging)	Gas	Glass/gauge/viewing		
H	Hand				High
I	Current		Indicate		
J	Power	Scan			
K	Time, time schedule	Time rate of change		Control station	
L	Level		Light		Low
M	User's choice				Middle / intermediate
N	User's choice (usually torque)		User choice	User choice	User choice
O	User's choice		Orifice		Open
P	Pressure		Point/test connection		
Q	Quantity	Totalize/integrate	Totalize/integrate		
R	Radiation		Record		Run
S	Speed, frequency			Switch	Stop
T	Temperature			Transmit	
U	Multivariable		Multifunction	Multifunction	
V	Vibration, mechanical analysis			Valve or damper	
W	Weight, force		Well or probe		
X	User's choice - usually on-off valve as XV	X-axis	Accessory devices, unclassified	Unclassified	Unclassified
Y	Event, state, presence	Y-axis		Auxiliary devices	
Z	Position, dimension	Z-axis or Safety		Actuator, driver or unclassified final control element	
