= Open-loop model =

Concept in game theory

In game theory, an open-loop model is the one where players cannot observe the play of their opponents, as opposed to a closed-loop model, where all past play is common knowledge. The solution to an open-loop model is called open-loop equilibrium.

Open loop models are more tractable, which is why they are sometimes preferred to closed-loop models even when the latter is a better description of reality.
