= Plant (control theory) =

Term in control theory

A plant in control theory is the combination of process and actuator. A plant is often referred to with a transfer function (commonly in the s-domain) which indicates the relation between an input signal and the output signal of a system without feedback, commonly determined by physical properties of the system. An example would be an actuator with its transfer of the input of the actuator to its physical displacement. In a system with feedback, the plant still has the same transfer function, but a control unit and a feedback loop (with their respective transfer functions) are added to the system.
