= Process variable =

Value of a given part of a monitored or controlled process

In control theory, a process variable (PV; also process value or process parameter) is the current measured value of a particular part of a process which is being monitored or controlled. An example of this would be the temperature of a furnace. The current temperature is the process variable, while the desired temperature is known as the setpoint (SP).

== Control system use ==
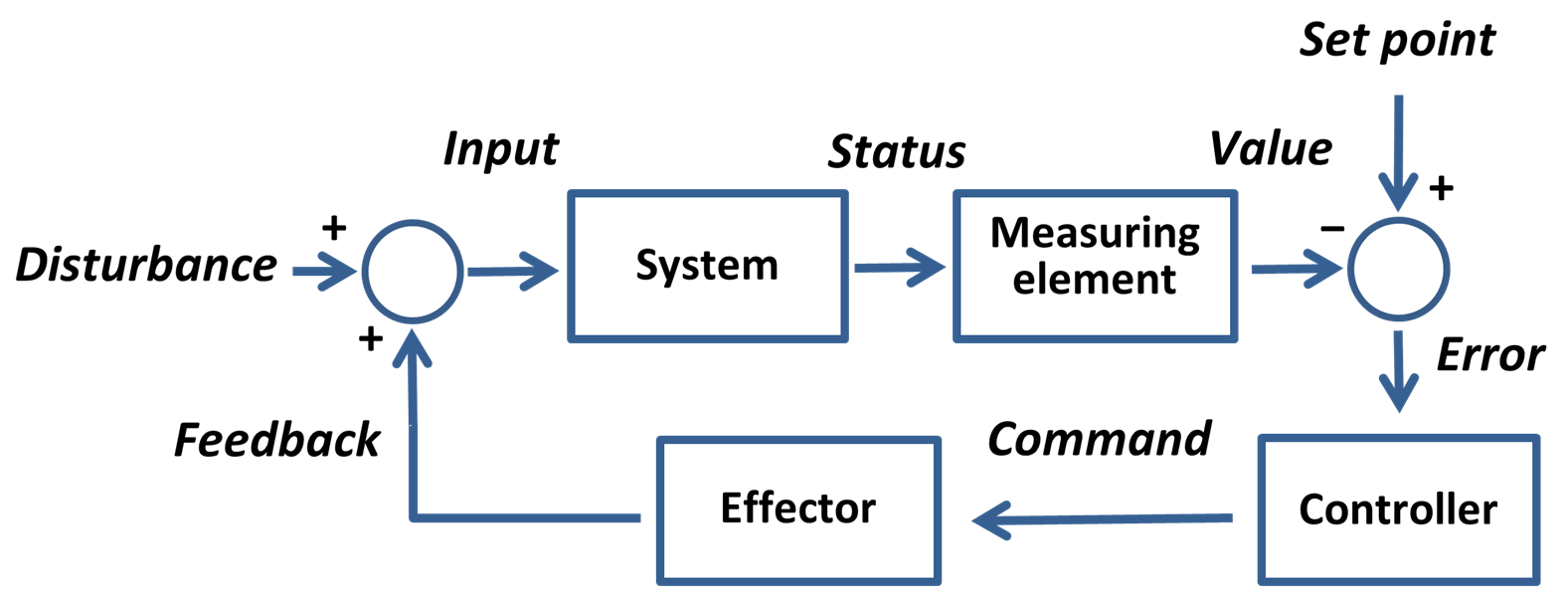
Block diagram of a negative feedback control system used to maintain PV = SP

Measurement of process variables is essential in control systems to controlling a process. The value of the process variable is continuously monitored so that control may be exerted.

Four commonly measured variables that affect chemical and physical processes are: pressure, temperature, level and flow, but there are in fact a large number of measurement quantities which, for international purposes, use the International System of Units (SI)

The SP-PV error is used to exert control on a process so that the value of PV equals the value of the SP. A classic use of this is in the PID controller.
