= List of types of systems theory =

This list of types of systems theory gives an overview of different types of systems theory, which are mentioned in scientific book titles or articles. The following more than 40 types of systems theory are all explicitly named systems theory and represent a unique conceptual framework in a specific field of science.

Systems theory has been formalized since the 1950s, and a long set of specialized systems theories and cybernetics exist. In the beginnings, general systems theory was developed by Ludwig von Bertalanffy to overcome the over-specialisation of the modern times and as a worldview using holism. The systems theories nowadays are closer to the traditional specialisation than to holism, by interdependencies and mutual division by mutually-different specialists.

== A ==
- Abstract systems theory (also see: formal system)
- Action Theory
- Adaptive systems theory (also see: complex adaptive system)
- Applied general systems theory (also see: general systems theory)
- Applied multidimensional systems theory
- Archaeological systems theory (also see: Systems theory in archaeology)
- Systems theory in anthropology
- Associated systems theory

== B ==
- Behavioral systems theory
- Biochemical systems theory
- Biomatrix systems theory
- Body system

== C ==
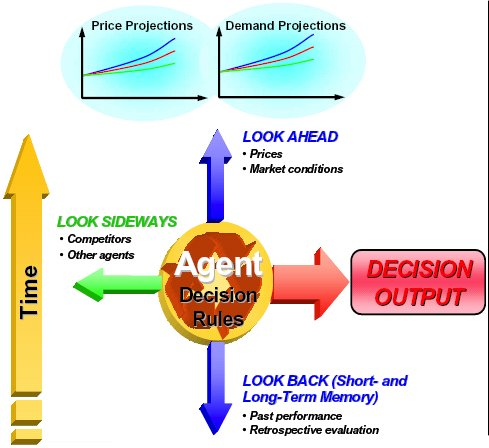
Complex adaptive system theory.

- Complex adaptive systems theory (also see: complex adaptive system)
- Complex systems theory (also see: complex systems)
- Computer-aided systems theory
- Conceptual systems theory (also see: conceptual system)
- Control systems theory (also see: control system)
- Critical systems theory (also see: critical systems thinking, and critical theory)
- Cultural Agency Theory

== D ==
- Developmental systems theory
- Distributed parameter systems theory
- Dynamical systems theory

== E ==
- Ecological systems theory (also see: ecosystem, ecosystem ecology)
- Economic systems theory (also see: economic system)
- Electric energy systems theory

== F ==
- Family systems theory (also see: systemic therapy)
- Fuzzy systems theory (also see: fuzzy logic)

== G ==
- General systems theory

== H ==
- Human systems theory (see: human systems)

== I ==
- Infinite dimensional systems theory

== L ==
- Large scale systems theory
- Liberating systems theory
- Linear systems theory (also see: linear system)
- Living systems theory
- LTI system theory

== M ==
- Macrosystems theory
- Mathematical systems theory
- Medical ethics systems theory
- Modeling systems theory
- Modern control systems theory
- Modern systems theory
- Multidimensional systems theory

== N ==
- Nonlinear stochastic systems theory (also see: stochastic modeling). General system approach

== O ==
- Operating systems theory (also see: operating system)
- Open systems theory (also see: open system)

== P ==
- Pattern language was first conceived by Christoper Alexander and has many similarities with systems thinking. It too is a way of describing how things work holistically. Originally applied to architecture, it has been extended into other fields.
- Physical systems theory (also see: physical system)
- Pulley system

== R ==
- Retrieval system theory

== S ==
- Social systems theory (also see: social system)
- Sociotechnical systems theory
- Social rule system theory

== T ==
- Transit systems theory

== W ==
- World-systems theory

== See also ==
Closely related subjects

- Cellular automata
- Chaos theory
- Cybernetics
- Mathematical models
- A New Kind of Science
- Social dynamics
- Sociocybernetics
- Soft systems methodology
- Statistical process control
- Systemics
- Tectology
- Total quality management

Systems related topics

- System analysis
- Systems biology
- Systems dynamics
- Systems engineering
- Systems philosophy
- Systems thinking
- Systems theory in political science
- Systems science
- Systemography

Other systems listings

- Glossary of systems theory
- List of systems scientists
- List of types of systems engineering
