= Systemography =

Systemography (SGR) is a process where phenomena regarded as complex are purposefully represented as a constructed model of a general system. It may be used in three different ways: conceptualization, analysis, and simulation. The work of Jean-Louis Le Moigne is associated with systemography.

Systemography modeling consists of building, simultaneously, the process' operational, informational and decisional systemographs in modeling phase. Ettore Bresciani Filho (2001) recommends the following order in systemography modeling:

1. Define the border of the system to be modeled, characterizing the border's processors responsible for the system's inputs and outputs.
2. Build the operational systemograph of the production system, disposing in a block diagram the production process' different stages, representing each with an operational processor.
3. Build the informational systemograph of the production system, disposing in a block diagram the different stages of the information's generation, transformation and communication, representing each with an informational processor.
4. Build the decisional systemograph of the production system, disposing in a block diagram the different stages of the decision's process representing each one with decisional processors.
5. Classify the processors of the systemographs in categories, types and levels; building a comparative table of processors.
6. Identify the possible forces fields influences, such as culture and organizational climate.
7. Relate the problems in priority order, applying problem analysis techniques to identify and find solutions for each one of them.
8. Use mathematical methods for the modeling the processors as the system as a whole.
9. Propose the solution of the problems in the form of recommendations and procedures to be adopted.

To systemograph consists, in a few words, in building a model, physical or mathematical, static or dynamic, analytical or numeric of a phenomenon that can be noticed as complex by the analyzer that intends to model it.

The elaboration of the operational systemographs (presenting the operations involved in the process), of the informational systemographs (where the information flow is highlighted) and of the decisional systemographs (where the decisions are shown) allows, during the activity analysis, to evaluate it and to improve it.

These systemographs allow to observe and to eliminate redundancies and cycles that are (or not) important for the process, providing its systemic visualization, identifying points to allow its rationalization, increase of flexibility, and activation.

== History ==
The systemography was studied and presented theoretically by Jean-Louis LeMoigne (1990; 1994) in his Théorie du Système Général (1994). Bresciani Filho presents, in his works and through his students, a practical use of the systemography concepts, particularly for systems of production and of information.

== See also ==
- Cybernetics
- Dynamical system
- Emergence
- Glossary of systems theory
- Holism
- List of types of systems theory
- Meta-system
- Multidimensional system
- Open and closed systems in social science
- Social complexity
- Social rule system theory
- Systemantics
- Systemics
- Systems engineering
- Systems psychology
- Systems theory
- Systems theory in anthropology
- Systems theory in archaeology
- Systems theory in political science
- World-systems theory
