= Caucus for a New Political Science =

Formal section within the American Political Science Association (APSA)

The Caucus for a New Political Science (CNPS) was first founded in 1967 as a caucus, and then a formal section, within the American Political Science Association (APSA). APSA is the official professional organization of political scientists in the United States, with over 15,000 members worldwide. CNPS' membership rolls at present indicate between 425 and 475 members. The CNPS emerged to challenge the principle of neutrality contained in the APSA by-laws and to encourage political activism among those in the profession. Critics and supporters have characterized the mission of the CNPS as explicitly political and left in its orientation. Critics have charged that CNPS was responsible for negatively affecting the APSA in 1968 and 1969 with the challenge to association's commitment to political neutrality on public issues of the day. It is generally observed that CNPS was the first section of its kind within APSA and opened the door for the formal recognition by APSA of a variety of sections dedicated to more explicitly engaged scholarship. Among those groups and caucuses that subsequently sought and gained formal section recognition within APSA are: Women & Politics; Race & Ethnicity; Sexuality and Politics as well as affiliated groups such as the Lesbian, Gay, Bi-Sexual, and Transgender group and The Labor Project.

The official mission of CNPS is "to make the study of politics relevant to the struggle for a better world." (apsa website) In 1971, the group incorporated as the Caucus for a New Political Science (CNPS) as a non-profit educational organization. The group's official name within APSA is "New Political Science". The non-profit entity owns and operates the peer-reviewed journal New Political Science: a journal of politics and culture, published by the Taylor & Francis Group.

The non-profit also sponsors public addresses by prominent progressive public intellectuals including Barbara Ehrenreich, Noam Chomsky, Cornel West, Frances Fox Piven, Lani Guinier, John Conyers, Barney Frank, Rashid Khalidi, former AFL-CIO president John Sweeney, and Michael Parenti. The CNPS has also issued political positions outside of APSA as a signatory on several national campaigns defending intellectuals and artists experiencing public criticism and controversy such as Tony Kushner, Rashid Khalidi and Frances Fox Piven.

== Philosophical origins ==
Established at the 1967 meeting of the American Political Science Association (APSA), the stated goal of New Political Science was to provide alternative views to the behavioralist school of thought that dominated APSA. The CNPS sought to end official APSA restrictions on resolutions on public matters, as well as the institutional practice of not sponsoring forums where members might analyze and debate such matters as the Vietnam War. Two political science professors and APSA members led the campaign and then founding of the Caucus. H. Mark Roelofs, from New York University, and Christian Bay from the University of Alberta are credited with forming the ideological basis of the organization. Bay was a prominent scholar, best known for his book The Structure of Freedom which presented a critique of systems analysis and the prioritizing of abstract concepts over the practical needs of society.

The catalyst for Roelofs and Bay's formal break with APSA emerged after several resolutions (many involving the Vietnam War and other public policy issues) were officially rejected or tabled by the APSA executive committee at the 1967 annual meeting in Chicago. At the time, active discussion and the taking of a position by APSA on the Vietnam War were forbidden under Article II of APSA's constitution. The constitution stated that the association would “not commit its members on questions of public policy nor take positions not immediately concerned with its direct purpose.”

== Within APSA ==
In 1969, two years after the controversial 1967 meeting, CNPS nominated a full ticket of presidential and vice-presidential candidates, as well as candidates for open Executive Council and Nominating Committee positions. The Caucus’ decision created an election scenario without precedent in APSA, and it was decided that it would be conducted by mail, and administered by the American Arbitration Association.

The CNPS leadership continued throughout the 1970s to run candidates for executive offices each year, until 1979. In each of those elections, the Caucus failed to win the presidency, coming closest in 1972 when Peter Bacharach captured 49.5% of the vote. However, results would decline throughout the rest of the decade and the Caucus ceased to nominate candidates. The failed bids to win executive seats caused members to leave the Caucus, the most-prominent being Alan Wolfe in 1971, and Theodore J. Lowi a few years later. Critics have suggested that CNPS has become “just another interest group within APSA” by abandoning its electoral challenges.

Others suggest CNPS helped transform the culture of APSA opening the door for progressive sections like the Women & Politics section, Race & Ethnicity section, and the Lesbian, Gay, Bi-sexual & Transgender sections as well as affiliated groups like the APSA Labor Project. Separately, and sometimes in coalition, these various groups have initiated and won several APSA Executive Council decisions related to the moving of the annual meeting based on arguments that conditions in the city or hotel in which the meeting is planned, presents a disruptive or hostile environment to significant portions of the membership.

== Journals: Politics and Society and New Political Science ==
In November 1970, a group of Caucus members created Politics and Society, a journal which would become a major showcase of political analyses through Marxist theory. Changes in internal dynamics in 1973 led to a new focus for the journal, and the 1976 departure of Alan Wolfe removed any connection of the journal to CNPS. By the late 1970s, a broadsheet entitled New Political Science emerged, becoming an official journal in 1979. New Political Science has since become the official publication of the Caucus.

== Today ==
The Caucus remains a forum for publication, discussion, and the exchange of information for young and established academics with progressive political commitments. The Caucus hosts an annual Saturday evening plenary address at the Annual APSA Meeting on public issues of controversy. The CNPS also presents several juried awards each year, including the Christian Bay Award (best meeting paper), the Michael Harrington Award (best book); Charles McCoy Award (career achievement) and the Cloward & Piven Award (for a deserving social justice organization in the city in which the annual APSA meeting is being held).
