= Politics & Society =

- Discipline: Political science Sociology Economics
- Language: English
- Edited by: Politics & Society

Publication details
- History: 1970-present
- Publisher: SAGE Publications
- Frequency: Quarterly
- Impact factor: 2.268 (2018)

Standard abbreviations
- ISO 4: Politics Soc.

Indexing
- ISSN: 0032-3292
- LCCN: 70023465
- OCLC no.: 300290727

Links
- Journal homepage; Online access; Online archive

Politics & Society is a peer-reviewed academic journal. It was established in 1970 and is currently published by SAGE Publications.

The journal seeks to publish original analyses of politics, including its social roots and its consequences. Contributions are welcome from people of many disciplines, and they may take the form of theoretical essays, historical investigations, philosophical reflections, and empirical research. The journal emphasizes the use of lucid English in its articles. Politics & Society is committed to developing Marxist, post-Marxist, and other radical perspectives and to examining what Robert Lynd once called "some outrageous hypotheses."

== Abstracting and indexing ==
Politics & Society is abstracted and indexed in Scopus and the Social Sciences Citation Index.

== See also ==
- Caucus for a New Political Science
- List of political science journals
