= Thaddeus E. Weckowicz =

Thaddeus Eugene Weckowicz (c. 1919 – July 29, 2000) was a Polish-Canadian social scientist, Professor Emeritus of Psychiatry, Psychology, and Theoretical Psychology at the University of Alberta, and Research Associate, Center for Systems Research, University of Alberta, known for his research in chronic schizophrenics since the 1950s.

== Biography ==
Weckowicz was the son of Waclaw and Zofia. He received his Bachelor of Medicine (MB and ChB) from the Polish School of Medicine at the University of Edinburgh, his Diploma in Psychological Medicine (DPM) from the University of Leeds and his PhD from the University of Saskatchewan in Saskatoon, Saskatchewan, Canada.

Weckowicz started his career as psychologist in the late 1950s. In a notable experiment at the Saskatchewan Hospital in Weyburn. he "undertook perceptual experiments with patients in a long, narrow room that we built for him and established that schizophrenia does distort perception of distance, leaving a victim unsure about the space in which he moves". In the 1960s he became part of the faculty of the University of Alberta as associate of Ludwig von Bertalanffy, who was Professor at the University of Alberta from 1961 to 1968. From 1962 to 1984 Weckowicz was Professor of Psychiatry and Psychology at the University of Alberta, and Research Associate, Center for Systems Research, University of Alberta.

Weckowicz was married to Helen Pauline Grit Liebel-Weckowicz, Professor of History and Classics at the University of Alberta from 1962 to 1995, with whom Weckowicz co-authored the 1990 book A History of Great Ideas in Abnormal Psychology and some other articles.

== Publications ==
Books, a selection:

- Abram Hoffer; Humphrey Osmond (1967). The Hallucinogens. Elsevier. doi:10.1016/c2013-0-12543-3. ISBN 978-1-4832-3296-6. LCCN 66030086. OCLC 332437. OL 35255701M.
- 1971. Objective Therapy Predictors in Depression: A Multivariate Approach by T.E. Weckowicz and Others.
- 1984. Models of Mental Illness: Systems and Theories of Abnormal Psychology. June 1984
- 1989. Ludwig von Bertalanffy (1901-1972): A Pioneer of General Systems Theory. Working paper Feb 1989. p. 2
- 1990. A History of Great Ideas in Abnormal Psychology. Co-authored with Helen P. Liebel-Weckowicz. Advances in Psychology V66, book series. North-Holland.

Articles, a selection:

- 1957. "Skin Histamine Test in Schizophrenia". With R. Hall. in: Journal of Nervous & Mental Disease: Vol 125, Is. 3. p. 452-458
- 1957. "Size constancy in schizophrenic patients". In: The British Journal of Psychiatry, 1957
- 1958. "Distance Constancy in Schizophrenic Patients". Co-authored with R. Sommer and R. Hall in: The British Journal of Psychiatry 104: 1174–1182.
- 1959. "Size constancy and abstract thinking in schizophrenic patients". With D.B. Blewett in: The British Journal of Psychiatry
- 1960. "Body Image and Self-Concept in Schizophrenia An Experimental Study". With R. Sommer in: The British Journal of Psychiatry
- 1966. "The Dimensionality of Clinical Depression," with A.J. Cropley in: Australian Journal of Psychology, 18 (1966)
- 1967. "A factor analysis of the Beck Inventory of Depression." With W. Muir and A.J. Cropley in: Journal of Consulting
- 1975. "Effect of Marijuana Divergent and Convergent Production Cognitive Tests," Journal of Abnormal Psychology 84 (1975):
- 1982. "Typologies of the theory of behaviorism since Descartes". With Helen P. Liebel-Weckowicz in: Sudhoffs Arch. 1982;66(2):129-51.
- 1988. "Ludwig Von Bertalanffy’s Contributions to Theoretical Psychology" in: Recent Research in Psychology 1988, pp 265–272
- 1990. "A History of Great Ideas". in: Abnormal Psychology. Elsevier, 1990
