= Post-behavioralism =

Movement in political science

Post-behavioralism (or post-behaviouralism) also known as neo-behavioralism (or neo-behaviouralism) was a reaction against the dominance of behavioralist methods in the study of politics. One of the key figures in post-behaviouralist thinking was David Easton who was originally one of the leading advocates of the "behavioral revolution". Post-behavioralists claimed that despite the alleged value-neutrality of behavioralist research it was biased towards the status quo and social preservation rather than social change.

== Key tenets ==
- Post-behavioralism challenged the idea that academic research had to be value neutral and argued that values should not be neglected.
- Post-behavioralism claimed that behavioralism's bias towards observable and measurable phenomena meant that too much emphasis was being placed on easily studied trivial issues at the expense of more important topics.
- Research should be more relevant to society and intellectuals have a positive role to play in society.

== Criticism ==
Heinz Eulau described post-behavioralism as a "near hysterical response to political frustrations engendered by the disconcerting and shocking events of the late sixties and early seventies".

== See also ==
- Positivism
