= Christian Bay =

Canadian academic (1921–1990)

Christian Bay (1921 – May 8, 1990) was a Canadian political theorist and the chairman of the political science department at the University of Alberta in Canada. He formed the ideological basis for the Caucus for a New Political Science of the APSA and an important critique of Behavioral Politics. He is associated with Normative Political Science and the New institutionalism approach of politics.

Bay was born in Oslo and received his Ph.D. at the University of Oslo in 1958, with his book The Structure of Freedom serving as his doctoral dissertation. This work was a psychological study of the quest for freedom and later that year earned him the Woodrow Wilson Foundation's 1959 book award.

Bay went on to teach in the United States at Stanford University and the University of California, Berkeley before becoming chairman of the political science department at the University of Alberta in Edmonton in 1966. He joined the University of Toronto faculty in 1972 and retired in 1988. He died on May 8, 1990, of pneumonia at Toronto Western Hospital.
