= General System Theory: Foundations, Development, Applications =

1968 book by Ludwig von Bertalanffy

- Author: Ludwig von Bertalanffy
- Language: English
- Subjects: Systems theory General systems theory
- Publisher: George Braziller
- Publication date: 1968
- Publication place: United States
- Media type: Print (Hardcover and Paperback)
- Pages: xv, 289
- ISBN: 9780807604533
- OCLC: 131976
- Dewey Decimal: 001.5/3
- LC Class: Q295 .B4

General System Theory: Foundations, Development, Applications is a 1968 book by the biologist and systems theorist Ludwig von Bertalanffy. The book presents the foundations, development and applications of general system theory and discusses the role of systems in biology, psychology, psychiatry and the social sciences.

The volume consists of ten essays and an appendix dealing with general system theory and the study of biological and social organisms and with the unification of science.

== Overview ==
The book argues that systems consist of parts in interaction and that the phenomena of systems can be studied as problems of configuration, complexity and organization. Bertalanffy proposes that there exist models, principles and laws that apply to generalized systems irrespective of their particular kind. The book presents parallels between principles in different disciplines and stresses the relations between biology, psychology, psychiatry and the social sciences.

== Concepts ==
A concept discussed in the book is equifinality, which states that in an open system the same final state can be reached from different initial conditions and in different ways. The work examines open systems and organization as general problems of science. Several chapters also discuss systems theory in biology and the social sciences and introduce mathematical concepts used in the analysis of systems, including differential equations.

== Background ==
Many of the essays included in the book had appeared previously in earlier publications, some dating to the 1940s. Bertalanffy had been developing ideas related to general system theory since at least 1945. The author indicates in the foreword that "systems theory—originally intended to overcome current overspecialization—[is becoming] another of the hundreds of academic specialties". (Note: Quoted in Rosen (1969)) Hence, the book was partly intended as a restatement of the general character of system theory because the systems idea had increasingly become associated with specialized fields such as cybernetics, automation and systems engineering. Bertalanffy presented system theory as a holistic alternative to reductionistic mechanism.

== Reception ==
Robert Rosen reviewed the book in Science in 1969 and described it as an "authoritative and noble volume," praising Bertalanffy for emphasizing the "deep homologies" that appear between sciences concerned with organization. Rosen nevertheless argued that the work "deliberately minimized" the technical development of system theory and suggested that the future of the field would necessarily become more technical.

Arnold Goldberg reviewed the book in Archives of General Psychiatry in 1969 and summarized the theory as the study of systems consisting of parts "in interaction". Discussing Bertalanffy's claim that there 'exist models, principles, and laws' applying to generalized systems 'irrespective of their particular kind', Goldberg suggested that the idea expresses something researchers "must have known" yet had not consistently used in their field. Goldberg also noted that some mathematical sections may be difficult for readers and considered Bertalanffy's overview of psychiatry the "weakest part of the book."

Fritjof Capra and Pier Luigi Luisi later discussed Bertalanffy's work in The Systems View of Life (2014), describing his project as an attempt to replace the "mechanistic foundations of science" with a "holistic vision". They quote Bertalanffy's description of general system theory as a science of "wholeness" that would become a mathematical discipline applicable to sciences concerned with "organized wholes". After discussing the systems theory precursor Alexander Bogdanov, who developed a theory of organization called tektology, the authors note that Bertalanffy's General System Theory contains "no reference to Bogdanov whatsoever". They add that "it is difficult to understand how Bertalanffy, who was widely read and published all his original work in German, would not have come across Bogdanov's work".

== See also ==
- Systems theory
- Open system (systems theory)
- Holism
