= Systemics =

Study of systems

In the context of systems science and systems philosophy, systemics is an initiative to study systems. It is an attempt at developing logical, mathematical, engineering and philosophical paradigms and frameworks in which physical, technological, biological, social, cognitive and metaphysical systems can be studied and modeled.

The term "systemics" was coined in the 1970s by Mario Bunge and others, as an alternative paradigm for research related to general systems theory and systems science.

== See also ==
- Autopoiesis
- Cybernetics
- Dynamic system
- Integral theory
- Meta-knowledge
- Meta-system
- Meta-theory
- Relativism
- Reliabilism
- System engineering
- Scientific paradigm
- Socio-cognitive
- System dynamics
- Systemography
- Systems theory
- Triune continuum paradigm
