= Dynamical systems theory =

Area of mathematics

Dynamical systems theory is an area of mathematics used to describe the behavior of complex dynamical systems, usually by employing differential equations or difference equations. When differential equations are employed, the theory is called continuous dynamical systems. From a physical point of view, continuous dynamical systems are a generalization of classical mechanics, a generalization where the equations of motion are postulated directly and are not constrained to be Euler–Lagrange equations of a least action principle. When difference equations are employed, the theory is called discrete dynamical systems.

This theory deals with the long-term qualitative behavior of dynamical systems, and studies the nature of, and when possible the solutions of, the equations of motion of systems that are often primarily mechanical or otherwise physical in nature, such as planetary orbits and the behaviour of electronic circuits, as well as systems that arise in biology, economics, and elsewhere. Much of modern research is focused on the study of chaotic systems and bizarre systems.

This field of study is also called dynamical systems, mathematical dynamics, mathematical dynamical systems theory or the mathematical theory of dynamical systems.

A chaotic solution of the Lorenz system, which is an example of a non-linear dynamical system. Studying the Lorenz system helped give rise to chaos theory.

== Overview ==
Dynamical systems theory and chaos theory deal with the long-term qualitative behavior of dynamical systems. Here, the focus is not on finding precise solutions to the equations defining the dynamical system (which is often hopeless), but rather to answer questions like "Will the system settle down to a steady state in the long term, and if so, what are the possible steady states?", or "Does the long-term behavior of the system depend on its initial condition?"

An important goal is to describe the fixed points, or steady states of a given dynamical system; these are values of the variable that do not change over time. Some of these fixed points are attractive, meaning that if the system starts out in a nearby state, it converges towards the fixed point.

Similarly, one is interested in periodic points, states of the system that repeat after several timesteps. Periodic points can also be attractive. Sharkovskii's theorem is an interesting statement about the number of periodic points of a one-dimensional discrete dynamical system.

Even simple nonlinear dynamical systems often exhibit seemingly random behavior that has been called chaos. The branch of dynamical systems that deals with the clean definition and investigation of chaos is called chaos theory.

== History ==
The concept of dynamical systems theory has its origins in Newtonian mechanics. There, as in other natural sciences and engineering disciplines, the evolution rule of dynamical systems is given implicitly by a relation that gives the state of the system only a short time into the future.

Before the advent of fast computing machines, solving a dynamical system required sophisticated mathematical techniques and could only be accomplished for a small class of dynamical systems.

Some excellent presentations of mathematical dynamical systems theory include Beltrami (1998), Luenberger (1979), Padulo & Arbib (1974), and Strogatz (1994).

== Concepts ==
=== Dynamical systems ===
The dynamical system concept is a mathematical formalization for any fixed "rule" that describes the time dependence of a point's position in its ambient space. Examples include the mathematical models that describe the swinging of a clock pendulum, the flow of water in a pipe, and the number of fish each spring in a lake.

A dynamical system has a state determined by a collection of real numbers, or more generally by a set of points in an appropriate state space. Small changes in the state of the system correspond to small changes in the numbers. The numbers are also the coordinates of a geometrical space—a manifold. The evolution rule of the dynamical system is a fixed rule that describes what future states follow from the current state. The rule may be deterministic (for a given time interval one future state can be precisely predicted given the current state) or stochastic (the evolution of the state can only be predicted with a certain probability).

=== Nonlinear system ===
In mathematics, a nonlinear system is a system that is not linear—i.e., a system that does not satisfy the superposition principle. Less technically, a nonlinear system is any problem where the variable(s) to solve for cannot be written as a linear sum of independent components. A nonhomogeneous system, which is linear apart from the presence of a function of the independent variables, is nonlinear according to a strict definition, but such systems are usually studied alongside linear systems, because they can be transformed to a linear system as long as a particular solution is known.

== Related fields ==
=== Arithmetic dynamics ===
Arithmetic dynamics is a field that emerged in the 1990s that amalgamates two areas of mathematics, dynamical systems and number theory. Classically, discrete dynamics refers to the study of the iteration of self-maps of the complex plane or real line. Arithmetic dynamics is the study of the number-theoretic properties of integer, rational, p-adic, and/or algebraic points under repeated application of a polynomial or rational function.

=== Chaos theory ===
Chaos theory describes the behavior of certain dynamical systems – that is, systems whose state evolves with time – that may exhibit dynamics that are highly sensitive to initial conditions (popularly referred to as the butterfly effect). As a result of this sensitivity, which manifests itself as an exponential growth of perturbations in the initial conditions, the behavior of chaotic systems appears random. This happens even though these systems are deterministic, meaning that their future dynamics are fully defined by their initial conditions, with no random elements involved. This behavior is known as deterministic chaos, or simply chaos.

=== Complex systems ===
Complex systems is a scientific field that studies the common properties of systems considered complex in nature, society, and science. It is also called complex systems theory, complexity science, study of complex systems and/or sciences of complexity. The key problems of such systems are difficulties with their formal modeling and simulation. From such perspective, in different research contexts complex systems are defined on the base of their different attributes.

The study of complex systems is bringing new vitality to many areas of science where a more typical reductionist strategy has fallen short. Complex systems is therefore often used as a broad term encompassing a research approach to problems in many diverse disciplines including neurosciences, social sciences, meteorology, chemistry, physics, computer science, psychology, artificial life, evolutionary computation, economics, earthquake prediction, molecular biology and inquiries into the nature of living cells themselves.

=== Control theory ===
Control theory is an interdisciplinary branch of engineering and mathematics, in part it deals with influencing the behavior of dynamical systems.

=== Ergodic theory ===
Ergodic theory is a branch of mathematics that studies dynamical systems with an invariant measure and related problems. Its initial development was motivated by problems of statistical physics.

=== Functional analysis ===
Functional analysis is the branch of mathematics, and specifically of analysis, concerned with the study of vector spaces and operators acting upon them. It has its historical roots in the study of functional spaces, in particular transformations of functions, such as the Fourier transform, as well as in the study of differential and integral equations. This usage of the word functional goes back to the calculus of variations, implying a function whose argument is a function. Its use in general has been attributed to mathematician and physicist Vito Volterra and its founding is largely attributed to mathematician Stefan Banach.

=== Graph dynamical systems ===
The concept of graph dynamical systems (GDS) can be used to capture a wide range of processes taking place on graphs or networks. A major theme in the mathematical and computational analysis of graph dynamical systems is to relate their structural properties (e.g. the network connectivity) and the global dynamics that result.

=== Projected dynamical systems ===
Projected dynamical systems is a mathematical theory investigating the behaviour of dynamical systems where solutions are restricted to a constraint set. The discipline shares connections to and applications with both the static world of optimization and equilibrium problems and the dynamical world of ordinary differential equations. A projected dynamical system is given by the flow to the projected differential equation.

=== Symbolic dynamics ===
Symbolic dynamics is the practice of modelling a topological or smooth dynamical system by a discrete space consisting of infinite sequences of abstract symbols, each of which corresponds to a state of the system, with the dynamics (evolution) given by the shift operator.

=== System dynamics ===
System dynamics is an approach to understanding the behaviour of systems over time. It deals with internal feedback loops and time delays that affect the behaviour and state of the entire system. What makes using system dynamics different from other approaches to studying systems is the language used to describe feedback loops with stocks and flows. These elements help describe how even seemingly simple systems display baffling nonlinearity.

=== Topological dynamics ===
Topological dynamics is a branch of the theory of dynamical systems in which qualitative, asymptotic properties of dynamical systems are studied from the viewpoint of general topology.

== Applications ==
=== In biomechanics ===
In sports biomechanics, dynamical systems theory has emerged in the movement sciences as a viable framework for modeling athletic performance and efficiency. It comes as no surprise, since dynamical systems theory has its roots in Analytical mechanics. From psychophysiological perspective, the human movement system is a highly intricate network of co-dependent sub-systems (e.g. respiratory, circulatory, nervous, skeletomuscular, perceptual) that are composed of a large number of interacting components (e.g. blood cells, oxygen molecules, muscle tissue, metabolic enzymes, connective tissue and bone). In dynamical systems theory, movement patterns emerge through generic processes of self-organization found in physical and biological systems. There is no research validation of any of the claims associated to the conceptual application of this framework.

=== In cognitive science ===
Dynamical system theory has been applied in the field of neuroscience and cognitive development, especially in the neo-Piagetian theories of cognitive development. It is the belief that cognitive development is best represented by physical theories rather than theories based on syntax and AI. It also believed that differential equations are the most appropriate tool for modeling human behavior. These equations are interpreted to represent an agent's cognitive trajectory through state space. In other words, dynamicists argue that psychology should be (or is) the description (via differential equations) of the cognitions and behaviors of an agent under certain environmental and internal pressures. The language of chaos theory is also frequently adopted.

In it, the learner's mind reaches a state of disequilibrium where old patterns have broken down. This is the phase transition of cognitive development. Self-organization (the spontaneous creation of coherent forms) sets in as activity levels link to each other. Newly formed macroscopic and microscopic structures support each other, speeding up the process. These links form the structure of a new state of order in the mind through a process called scalloping (the repeated building up and collapsing of complex performance.) This new, novel state is progressive, discrete, idiosyncratic and unpredictable.

Dynamic systems theory has recently been used to explain a long-unanswered problem in child development referred to as the A-not-B error.

Further, since the middle of the 1990s cognitive science, oriented towards a system theoretical connectionism, has increasingly adopted the methods from (nonlinear) “Dynamic Systems Theory (DST)“. A variety of neurosymbolic cognitive neuroarchitectures in modern connectionism, considering their mathematical structural core, can be categorized as (nonlinear) dynamical systems. These attempts in neurocognition to merge connectionist cognitive neuroarchitectures with DST come from not only neuroinformatics and connectionism, but also recently from developmental psychology (“Dynamic Field Theory (DFT)”) and from “evolutionary robotics” and “developmental robotics” in connection with the mathematical method of “evolutionary computation (EC)”. For an overview see Maurer.

=== In second language development ===
The application of Dynamic Systems Theory to study second language acquisition is attributed to Diane Larsen-Freeman who published an article in 1997 in which she claimed that second language acquisition should be viewed as a developmental process which includes language attrition as well as language acquisition. In her article she claimed that language should be viewed as a dynamic system which is dynamic, complex, nonlinear, chaotic, unpredictable, sensitive to initial conditions, open, self-organizing, feedback sensitive, and adaptive.

== See also ==
Related subjects

- List of dynamical system topics
- Baker's map
- Biological applications of bifurcation theory
- Dynamical system (definition)
- Embodied Embedded Cognition
- Fibonacci numbers
- Fractals
- Gingerbreadman map
- Halo orbit
- List of types of systems theory
- Oscillation
- Postcognitivism
- Recurrent neural network
- Combinatorics and dynamical systems
- Synergetics
- Systemography

Related scientists

- People in systems and control
- Dmitri Anosov
- Vladimir Arnold
- Nikolay Bogolyubov
- Andrey Kolmogorov
- Nikolay Krylov
- Jürgen Moser
- Yakov G. Sinai
- Stephen Smale
- Hillel Furstenberg
- Grigory Margulis
- Elon Lindenstrauss
