= Telecoupling =

Concept in socioeconomics

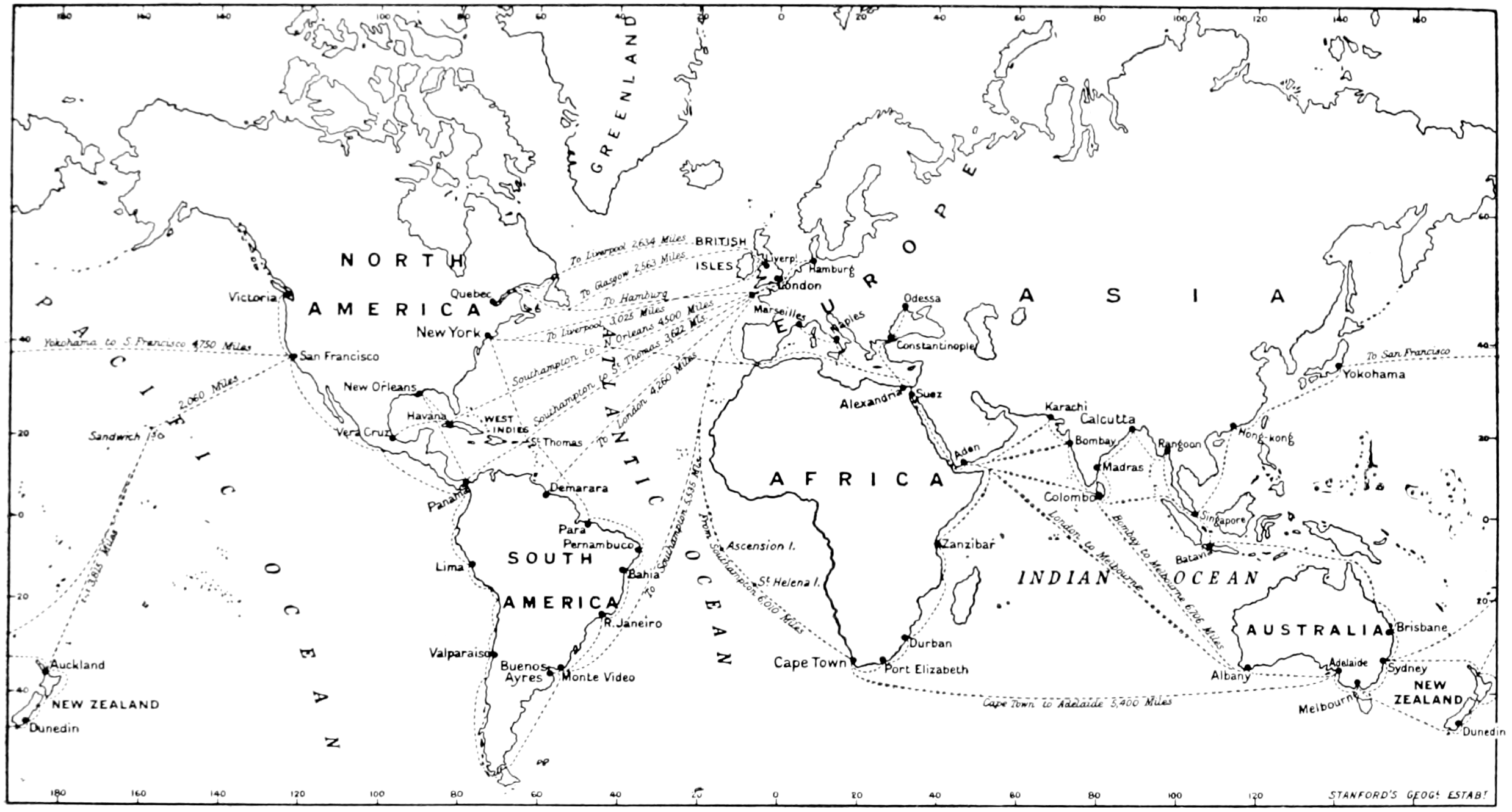
British Trade Routes. Trade is one of the most extensively studied forms of distant coupled human and natural system interactions that result in telecouplings.

Telecoupling is an interdisciplinary framework for studying socioeconomic and environmental interactions between distant coupled human and natural systems. The concept builds on research into such coupled systems, which are connected to produce social, ecological, and economic effects.

The term was coined by Jianguo Liu to expand on the concept of teleconnection, which is limited to atmospheric sciences. Telecoupling integrates multiple disciplines, including social science, environmental science, natural science, and systems science to analyze distant connections that were previously understudied. Trade is one of the most extensively studied forms of telecoupling.

== How it works ==
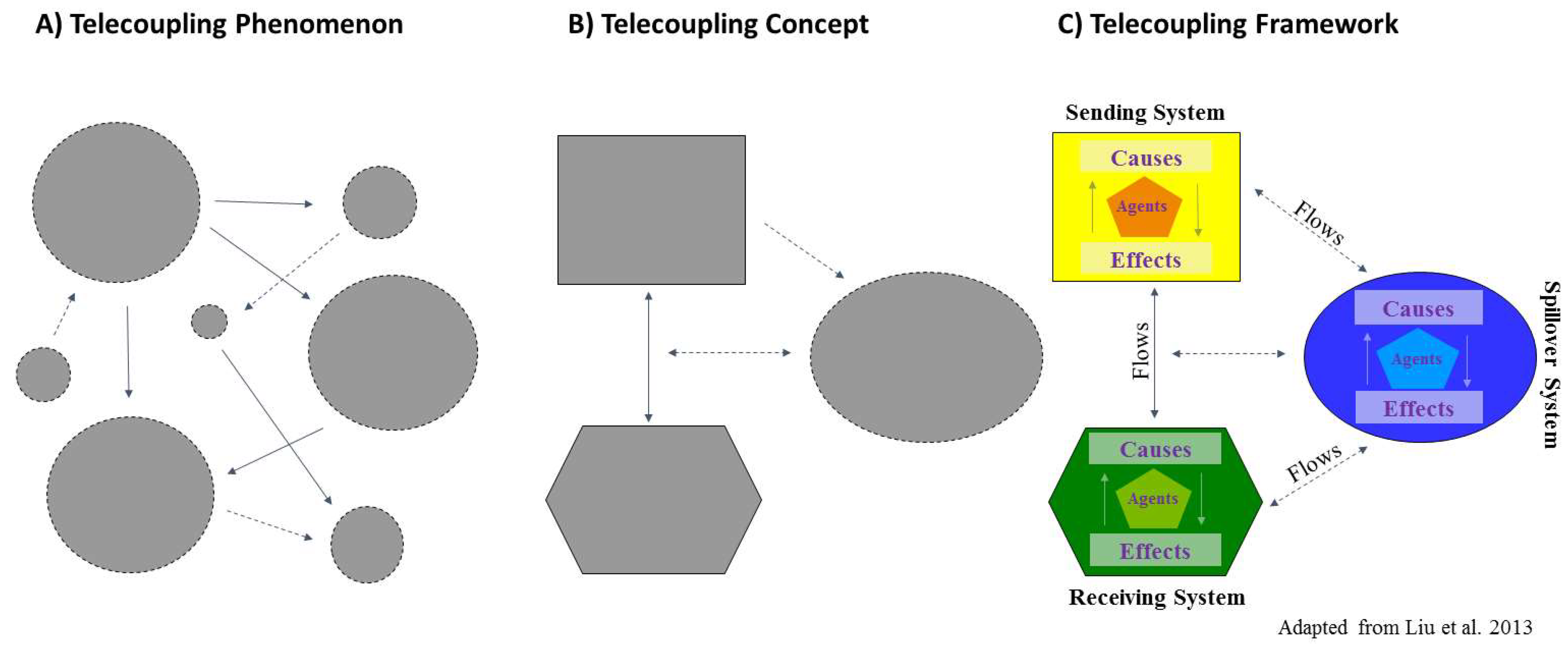
Telecoupling is a complex phenomena. The telecoupling framework has been developed to identify and organize the essential components of a telecoupling.

Telecoupled systems have 5 components: agents, causes, and effects, sending systems, and receiving systems. Agents facilitate system interactions which perform as the causes for the resulting effects. Change to one governance, or agent, within the system causes change to the other governance within the system due to their interactions. The effects are characterized as both socioeconomic and environmental, and are usually indirect, and therefore often ignored and difficult to create general policy around. The interactions between systems vary in substance. Fields such as "trade, knowledge transfer, species dispersal, tourism, water transfer, human migration, waste transfer, biophysical, technology transfer, investment, animal migration, and Ecosystem services flow" are all causes for interactions between systems that have been researched within a telecoupled framework. System interactions are recognized as "flows" within the telecoupling framework, and bring attention to "spillover sites" or "leakages."

An extension of telecoupled flows is the presence of feedback from the receiving, spillover, and sending systems. The feedback itself can effect the telecoupled system as a whole either by reinforcing the telecoupling, or weakening it. Feedback that exacerbates the telecoupling, whether it be beneficial or detrimental to the systems involved, is considered a positive feedback loop. Negative feedback weakens the connections among telecoupled systems. A singular change within telecoupled systems can result in a multitude of feedback loops among the involved governances.

== Forms of coupling ==
There are various categories of coupled systems, all of which are distinguished from one another as a result of their position, and scale. The interaction of governances within a telecoupled system is called an intracoupling and interactions between telecoupled systems are intercouplings. At the world's most encompassing systemic level, these couplings exist within metacouplings. Metacouplings are interactions that occur at both the inter- and intracoupling scales. In addition, couplings can also be defined by the distance they span. Pericouplings refer to adjacent couplings, while telecouplings specifically refer to ones at a distance from one another.

=== Metacoupling ===
Metacoupling is a new concept of research to systematically understand human-nature interactions (couplings), which can be classified into three major types: human-nature interactions within a coupled system (intracoupling), between distant coupled systems (telecoupling), and between adjacent coupled systems (pericoupling). Together, they constitute metacoupling. Metacoupling consists of intracoupling and intercoupling, which in turn includes pericoupling and telecoupling.

In Tromboni et al. 2021 the metacoupling framework is applied to the field of macrosystems biology in an effort to find reconciliation for ecological issues at the global scale. A metacoupling framework would expose unacknowledged connections within various fields of science, and provide new perspective as to how to analyze those connections. For example, Tromboni et al. justifies that ecologists working within a metacoupled framework would not confine themselves to the location of a species while analyzing a niche, but they would instead incorporate environmental factors experienced throughout the globe to study the species more comprehensively. In addition, the metacoupling framework, much like the telecoupling framework, seeks to analyze both socioeconomic and environmental effects concurrently.

== Power structures ==
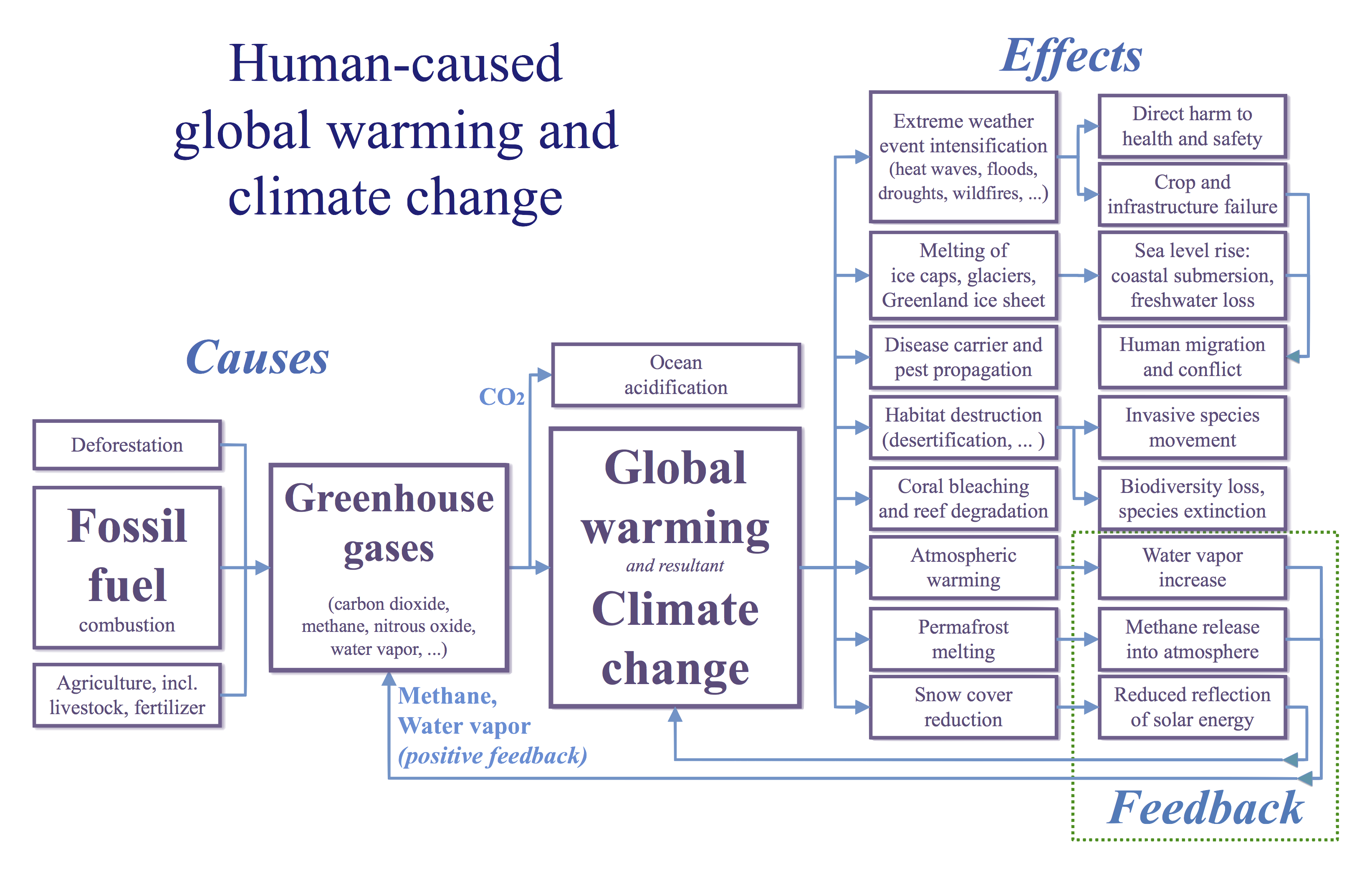
The atmosphere is a natural system that acts as a spillover site resulting from human systems' fossil fuel usage. There are a multitude of negative effects to greenhouse gas accumulation in the atmosphere.

Spillover sites are locations that are also affected by change within coupled human and natural system, but commonly play a peripheral role within the system's interactions. The spillover sites often undergo disturbances from telecoupled systems and without compensation because they are unnoticed by the other, more central, agents.

However, telecoupling as an analytical tool offers insight that could improve predictive models by acknowledging spillover sights; policy makers may be more comprehensively informed of the potential socioeconomic and environmental impacts that result from each policy change. Power dynamics between governances are more clearly revealed when analyzing coupled human and natural system flows, especially when compensation is not given to spillover sites despite complaint.

The atmospheric system, as a result of greenhouse gas accumulation, is a spillover site that lacks a governance, and has therefore been unrepresented. The unacknowledged, destructive effects of greenhouse gas emissions on the atmosphere has been integral to current climate change.

== Telecoupling, globalization and urbanization ==
=== Globalization ===
Globalization increases the effects of telecouplings in the rate, scale, and scope. Internet availability creates more connectivity as countries and regions are able to communicate and trade more promptly. As a result, change to one agent more rapidly effects the other. Rapid change is more vulnerable than slow change, and is more likely to lead to socioeconomic and environmental crises. While globalization makes system impacts more volatile, internet availability also makes interpreting telecoupled impacts easier. Prompt communication between governances within systems make recognition of the connection between distal impacts more likely. Current ideological shifts towards sustainable practices are likely motivated by the internet induced ability to recognize distal connectivities, and feel "empathy at a distance" for spillover sites.

=== Urbanization ===
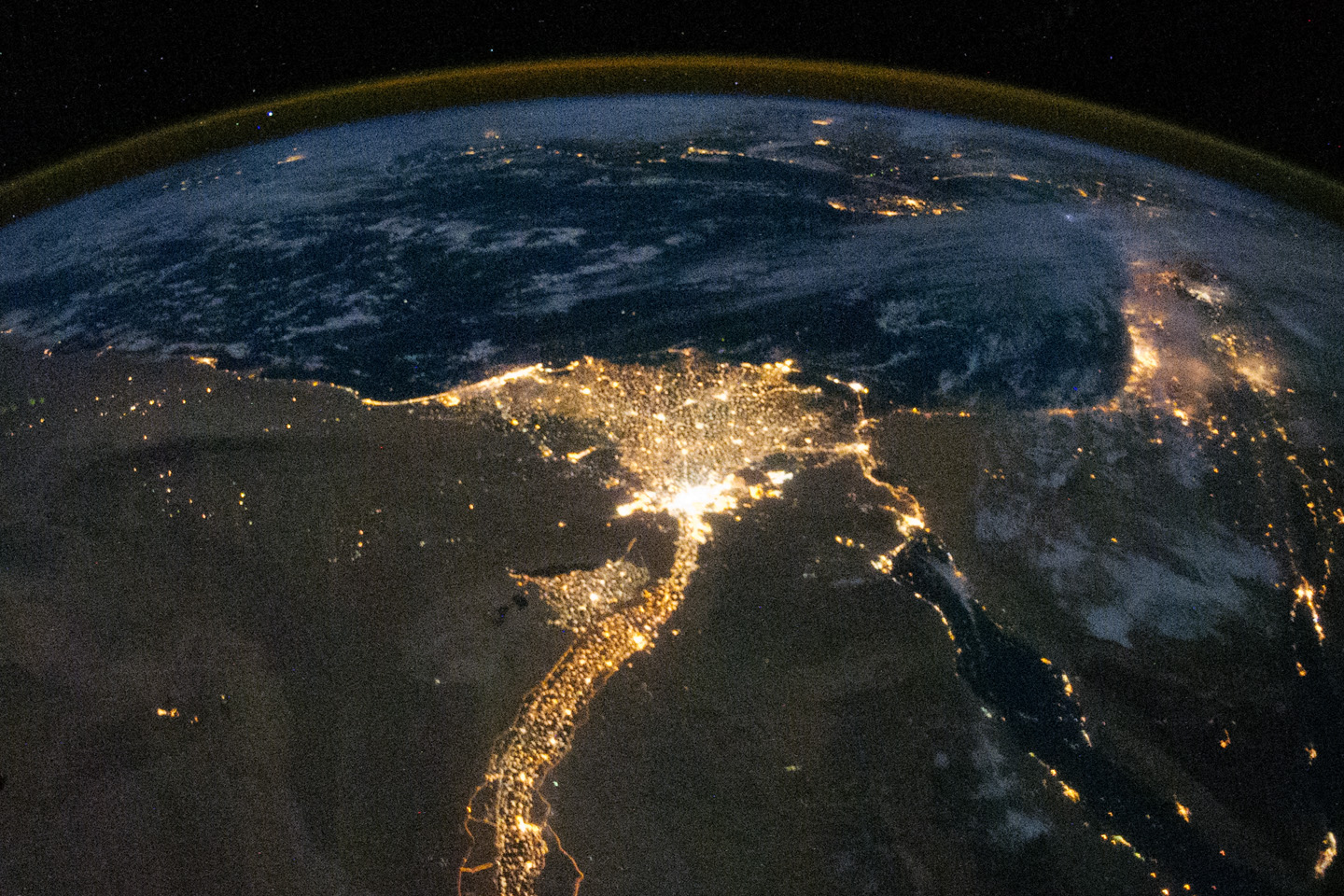
Urbanization surrounding the Nile River

Urbanization, like globalization, facilitates closer relationships among coupled systems because it requires the transportation of goods to the cities from distant locations; trade connects different governances as well as locations. Urban populations continue to grow exponentially; for example, 1.02 billion people lived in urban areas in the 1960s, and in 2010 that number was 3.56 billion. While urbanization increases the connectivity of a telecoupled system, urban areas also carry disproportionate responsibility for the resulting impacts of telecoupling. High density populations have more impact on telecoupling because there is more interaction present within these environments.

==== Deforestation ====
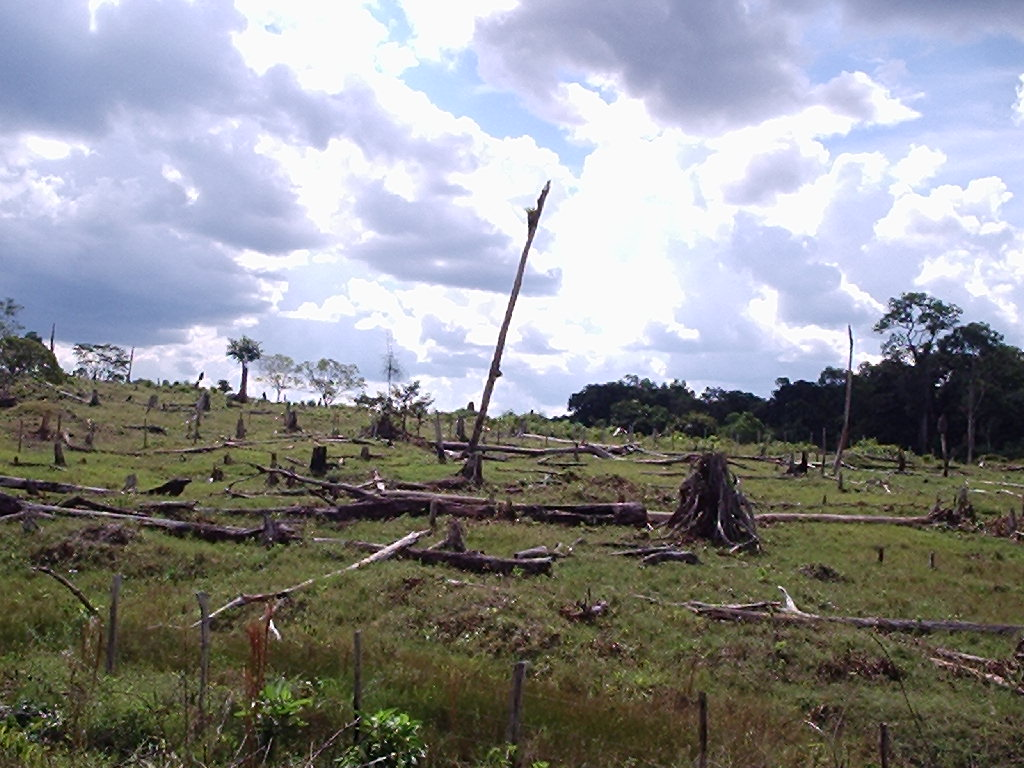
Rainforest deforestation

Deforestation is an example of how globalization and urbanization have led to and increased the effects of telecoupling. Prior to these patterns of human connection, countries would have been more localized in their resource efforts and relied mainly on self-supporting goods and services. Rather than outsourcing their needs, countries would depend on their own agricultural streams to circulate and propel the nation. For example, in Brazil, farmers would have cut down trees for their own farming needs to plant crops and make space for animals. However, urbanization placed pressures on rural areas to provide for those becoming more populated. Without direct access to natural resources, urban areas must rely on the countryside for support, sparking a more distant connection between goods and the people those goods serve.

As a result, the demand for more resources from cities indirectly increases deforestation and places greater pressure on forests from which natural resources are extracted. A high demand for meat from an expanding population requires farmers in Brazil to cut down trees and plant crops to feed their animals. This feed (generally soybeans) can be exported to countries around the world to support animal agriculture. This example is provided in more detail in the section below, and highlights the relevance of both globalization and urbanization in the telecoupling framework. Bryan Walsh writes, "It’s a bit like the old butterfly effect—only instead of a butterfly flapping its wings in Peking and creating a storm in America, it's an urban laborer in Beijing buying a bowl of pork noodles and causing a tree to be cut down in Brazil."

== Examples ==
=== Biofuel mandates ===
The European Union enacted policy aimed at reducing fuel emissions in response to increasing climate change. This mandate was created to promote the domestic production of biofuels and reduce overall CO_{2} emissions. There were unintended consequences as a result of these policies due to it being a telecoupled system. These policies included crop substitution which contributed to increased food prices and lowered the crop yield. The decrease in availability then caused a food shortage in 2008 in urban areas that did not have access to food unless it was transported into the city from surrounding rural areas. Cities also have the most dense populations, and the shortage ultimately led to civil unrest.

=== Red imported fire ants invasion ===
Red imported fire ants or RIFA are native to South America and are considered an invasive species. In the 1900s as a result of trade they were imported into the United States. From there they invaded Australia, New Zealand, and Asia due to their nature of being an invasive species. The effects of this invasion affected the economic sector of the United States very harshly causing $6 million in damages, primarily in the agriculture and trade fields. This another example of the connections of a telecoupled system with South America being the sending system, the US being the receiving system, and Australia, New Zealand, and Asia being the spillover systems.

=== Kirtland warbler migration ===
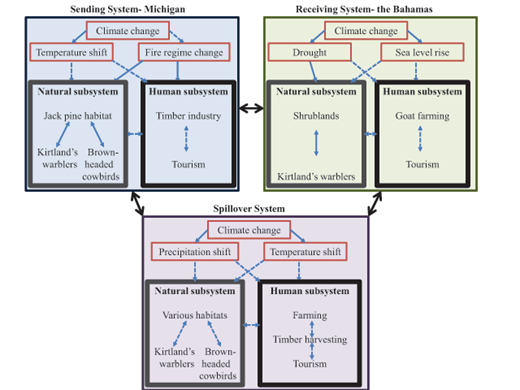
The telecoupling framework as applied to Kirland's Warblers

Kirtland's warbler is a species of migratory bird that leaves their breeding ground in the Michigan area for The Bahamas in the colder months. The Jack pine forests in Michigan provide much of the support and resources for the Kirtland's warblers. The logging industry and deforestation have led to a significant decline in the population. As the population became more vulnerable, the Brown-headed cowbird increased, and contributed to a further decline in the population of Kirtland's warblers. In response, both Michigan and the Bahamas attempted to protect the species, but created spillover effects in tourism, timber companies, and landowners of both locations.

=== Soybean exports ===
China is a major consumer of Soybeans; they provide sustenance for Chinese people, as well as for their livestock. Brazil is an agricultural producer of soybeans that frequently exports this agricultural product to China. While Brazil's economy is bolstered by this exportation, the Amazonian rainforest is depleted as it is deforested to expand agricultural lands. Deforestation has a multitude of detrimental effects on both the land, and its people. On a global scale, deforestation contributes to climate change-the spillover site for soybean exportation is then the entirety of the globe.

Recognition of the mass deforestation of the Amazonian rainforest resulted in a Soy Moratorium in which the practice of deforestation for soy production was banned. However, the Cerrado savanna, which is an extension of the Amazon, was not protected by the moratorium, which led to a shift in location for deforestation practices, but not a curtailment of them. In this instance, acknowledgment of telecoupled affects did not improve social or environmental conditions.

Land-use change as a result of soybean production is not limited to South America either. While demand for soy exponentially rises in China, so does the demand for soy in all countries in which the main food staple is meat. Gasparri and Waroux 2015 state that the Republic of south africa is the leading nation in soybean importation. Their analysis predicts that a new soybean frontier will be established in South Africa, resulting in a mass loss of grazing lands for cattle. The telecoupled socioeconomic and environmental effects of this new potential frontier could include economic decline for South American soybean production, increased Amazonian tree coverage, and civil unrest from both soybean farmers in South America, and livestock farmers in South Africa.

=== Belt and road initiative ===
This initiative proposed in 2013 attempts to revitalize the Silk Road by developing new infrastructure including railways, roads, pipelines, and airports between 65 participating nations. The economic impacts of the project have been researched extensively, while the potential social, and ecological impacts have been largely unacknowledged. Upon examination of the Belt and Road Initiative's (BRI) potential social, and ecological impacts, Yang et al. 2017 identify a plethora of challenge that may ensue, and require addressing, resulting from the telecoupled nature of the project. The first category of potential conflicts identified are the sandstorms and Earthquakes that frequent the land along the silk road. Physical damages, as well as delays in trade may unevenly affect the economies of the countries involved. The next set of potential conflicts arise from the uneven distribution of resources among the countries involved. Yang et al. specifically cites China's water distribution, as well as their reliance on coal and oil received from Middle Eastern countries.

The relationship between these nations may prove to be unstable due to this dependence, and negatively affect the participation in the BRI, as well as its economic standing. Telecoupled systems always share environmental issues. As a result, the 65 countries involved will share their experiences of pollution, species invasion, etc. Lastly, Yang analyzes the socioeconomics of the countries involved. Without the transportation provided by the BRI, there are frequent disputes over boundaries, resource usage, religion, and ethnicity. The telecoupled nature of the project may exacerbate or calm these current conditions.

== Limitations ==
Telecoupling is a relatively new framework that will require time and commitment to overcome its limitations. The novelty of the telecoupling framework means that there is sometimes a lack of investment from researchers that can help to progress the operationalization of the framework. Data limitations also restrict the framework from moving forward efficiently, and telecoupling endeavors will have to address these gaps in research and data to optimize the effectiveness of the framework itself. Liu writes, "Specific areas that have been understudied include how telecouplings emerge and dissolve, their impact on sustainability and best practices for encouraging positive rather than negative impacts, and more explicit accounting for local and regional interactions in a broader context." Further dedication to exploring these areas will allow the telecoupling framework to evolve in a socioeconomically and environmentally conscious manner.

Governance of telecoupling efforts has also been noted by scholars as a primary limitation to framework development. Cost-benefit analysis of telecoupling requires local and national involvement, occurring on multiple scales. It is suggested that local institutions reinforce their abilities to cope with larger markets, and that national institutions redirect some attention towards supporting local interests. Coordinating such ventures is hypothesized to centralize the telecoupling framework and allow for a flow of information and resources.

A final considerable limitation to telecoupling is an isolated view to network management. For example, groups interested in trade may heavily focus on money, information, and the resource being traded, while environmental aspects are largely ignored. Rather than finding a nexus between economy, society, and environment, interest groups may instead position themselves to suit their endeavors. While the economic variable of trade are evident (supply, demand, price), those that involve society and the environment cannot be overlooked. Understanding all flows among and between the variable of telecoupling is necessary for successful application of the framework. Moreover, comprehension of how these relationships change across various scales can be helpful in supporting the telecoupling framework and holistically analyzing broader themes of socioeconomic and environmental discourse.

== Conclusion ==
Globalization requires that autonomous governances interact, and therefore maintain interdependent relationships. However, telecoupling is an analytical tool that can only be applied to system interactions that include all the components of a telecoupled system. Without all components (three systems, agents, causes, effects, and flows) the relationship is not a telecoupling. As a result, while telecoupling is a framework that comprehensively recognizes both the socioeconomic and environmental factors present within system interactions, it cannot be universally applied nor used, as many system interactions can only be labeled as couplings, not telecouplings.
