= Systems theory in political science =

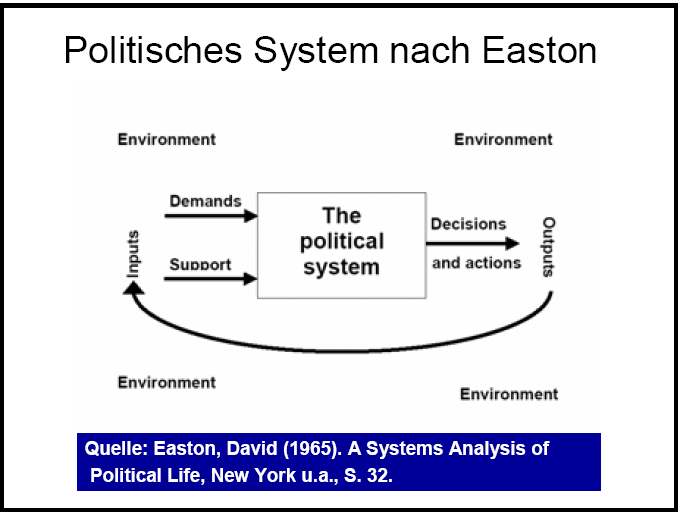
Easton, David (1965). A Systems Analysis of Political Life, New York, S.32.

Systems theory in political science is a highly abstract, partly holistic view of politics, influenced by cybernetics. The adaptation of system theory to political science was conceived by David Easton in 1953.

== Overview ==
In simple terms, Easton's behavioral approach to politics, proposed that a political system could be seen as a delimited (i.e. all political systems have precise boundaries) and fluid (changing) system of steps in decision making. Greatly simplifying his model: Influence of computers on the discipline of political science and the political system work within an environment. The environment generates different demands from different section of society such as reservation system in the matter of a certain group, demand for better transportation etc.

- Step 1. changes in the social or physical environment surrounding a political system produce "demands" and "supports" for action or the status quo directed as "inputs" towards the political system, through political behavior.
- Step 2, these demands and supporting groups stimulate competition in a political system, leading to decisions or "outputs" directed at some aspect of the surrounding social or physical environment.
- Step 3, after a decision or output is made (e.g., a specific policy), it interacts with its environment, and if it produces change in the environment, there are "outcomes."
- Step 4, when a new policy interacts with its environment, outcomes may generate new demands or supports and groups in support or against the policy ("feedback") or a new policy on some related matter.
- Step 5, feedback, leads back to Step 1, forming a never-ending cycle.

=== Political analysis ===
Easton aspired to make politics a science, that is, working with highly abstract models that described the regularities of patterns and processes in political life in general. In his view, the highest level of abstraction could make scientific generalizations about politics possible. In sum, politics should be seen as a whole, not as a collection of different problems to be solved.

His main model was driven by an organic view of politics, as if it were a living object. His theory is a statement of what makes political systems adapt and survive. He describes politics in a constant flux, thereby rejecting the idea of "equilibrium", so prevalent in some other political theories (see institutionalism). Moreover, he rejects the idea that politics could be examined by looking at different levels of analysis. His abstractions could account for any group and demand at any given time. That is, interest group theory and elite theory can be subsumed in political systems analysis. His theory was and is highly influential in the pluralist tradition in political science. (see Harold Lasswell and Robert Dahl)

== Critiques ==
Easton's approach has been criticised for being unfalsifiable and holding a Western or American bias, as well as not explaining crises or the breakdown of the system.

== See also ==
- Behavioralism
- Karl W. Deutsch
- Structural-functionalism
- Niklas Luhmann
