= Naïve empiricism =

Term used in several ways in different fields

Naïve empiricism is a term used in several ways in different fields.

In the philosophy of science, it is used by opponents to describe the position, associated with some logical positivists, that "knowledge can be clearly learnt through evaluation of the natural world and its substances, and, through empirical means, learn truths".

The term also is used to describe a particular methodology for literary analysis.

See also:

- Empiricism
- Falsifiability (especially, "Naïve falsification")
