= Multidimensional system =

System in which not only one independent variable exists

In mathematical systems theory, a multidimensional system or m-D system is a system in which not only one independent variable exists (like time), but there are several independent variables.

Important problems such as factorization and stability of m-D systems (m > 1) have recently attracted the interest of many researchers and practitioners. The reason is that the factorization and stability is not a straightforward extension of the factorization and stability of 1-D systems because, for example, the fundamental theorem of algebra does not exist in the ring of m-D (m > 1) polynomials.

== Applications ==
Multidimensional systems or m-D systems are the necessary mathematical background for modern digital image processing with many applications in biomedicine, X-ray technology and satellite communications. There are also some studies combining m-D systems with partial differential equations (PDEs).

== Linear multidimensional state-space model ==
A state-space model is a representation of a system in which the effect of all "prior" input values is contained by a state vector. In the case of an m-d system, each dimension has a state vector that contains the effect of prior inputs relative to that dimension. The collection of all such dimensional state vectors at a point constitutes the total state vector at the point.

Consider a uniform discrete space linear two-dimensional (2d) system that is space invariant and causal. It can be represented in matrix-vector form as follows:

Represent the input vector at each point $(i,j)$ by $u(i,j)$, the output vector by $y(i,j)$ the horizontal state vector by $R(i,j)$ and the vertical state vector by $S(i,j)$. Then the operation at each point is defined by:

$$\begin{align}
R(i+1,j) & = A_1R(i,j) + A_2S(i,j) + B_1u(i,j) \\
S(i,j+1) & = A_3R(i,j) + A_4S(i,j) + B_2u(i,j) \\
y(i,j) & = C_1R(i,j) +C_2S(i,j) + Du(i,j)
\end{align}$$

where $A_1, A_2, A_3, A_4, B_1, B_2, C_1, C_2$ and $D$ are matrices of appropriate dimensions.

These equations can be written more compactly by combining the matrices:

$$\begin{bmatrix}
R(i+1,j) \\
S(i,j+1) \\
y(i,j)
\end{bmatrix}
=
\begin{bmatrix}
A_1 & A_2 & B_1 \\
A_3 & A_4 & B_2 \\
C_1 & C_2 & D
\end{bmatrix}
\begin{bmatrix}
R(i,j) \\
S(i,j) \\
u(i,j)
\end{bmatrix}$$

Given input vectors $u(i,j)$ at each point and initial state values, the value of each output vector can be computed by recursively performing the operation above.

== Multidimensional transfer function ==
A discrete linear two-dimensional system is often described by a partial difference equation in the form: $\sum_{p,q=0,0}^{m,n}a_{p,q}y(i-p,j-q) = \sum_{p,q=0,0}^{m,n}b_{p,q}x(i-p,j-q)$

where $x(i,j)$ is the input and $y(i,j)$ is the output at point $(i,j)$ and $a_{p,q}$ and $b_{p,q}$ are constant coefficients.

To derive a transfer function for the system the 2d Z-transform is applied to both sides of the equation above.

$$\sum_{p,q=0,0}^{m,n} a_{p,q}z_1^{-p}z_2^{-q}Y(z_1,z_2) = \sum_{p,q=0,0}^{m,n}b_{p,q}z_1^{-p}z_2^{-q}X(z_1,z_2)$$

Transposing yields the transfer function $T(z_1,z_2)$:

$$T(z_1,z_2) = {Y(z_1,z_2) \over X(z_1,z_2)} = {\sum_{p,q=0,0}^{m,n}b_{p,q}z_1^{-p}z_2^{-q} \over \sum_{p,q=0,0}^{m,n}a_{p,q}z_1^{-p}z_2^{-q}}$$

So given any pattern of input values, the 2d Z-transform of the pattern is computed and then multiplied by the transfer function $T(z_1,z_2)$ to produce the Z-transform of the system output.

== Realization of a 2d transfer function ==
Often an image processing or other md computational task is described by a transfer function that has certain filtering properties, but it is desired to convert it to state-space form for more direct computation. Such conversion is referred to as realization of the transfer function.

Consider a 2d linear spatially invariant causal system having an input-output relationship described by:

$$Y(z_1,z_2) = {\sum_{p,q=0,0}^{m,n}b_{p,q}z_1^{-p}z_2^{-q} \over \sum_{p,q=0,0}^{m,n}a_{p,q}z_1^{-p}z_2^{-q}}X(z_1,z_2)$$

Two cases are individually considered 1) the bottom summation is simply the constant 1 2) the top summation is simply a constant $k$. Case 1 is often called the "all-zero" or "finite impulse response" case, whereas case 2 is called the "all-pole" or "infinite impulse response" case. The general situation can be implemented as a cascade of the two individual cases. The solution for case 1 is considerably simpler than case 2 and is shown below.

=== Example: all zero or finite impulse response ===
$$Y(z_1,z_2) = \sum_{p,q=0,0}^{m,n}b_{p,q}z_1^{-p}z_2^{-q}X(z_1,z_2)$$

The state-space vectors will have the following dimensions:

$R (1 \times m),\quad S (1 \times n),\quad x (1 \times 1)$ and $y (1 \times 1)$

Each term in the summation involves a negative (or zero) power of $z_1$ and of $z_2$ which correspond to a delay (or shift) along the respective dimension of the input $x(i,j)$. This delay can be effected by placing $1$’s along the super diagonal in the $A_1$. and $A_4$ matrices and the multiplying coefficients $b_{i,j}$ in the proper positions in the $A_2$. The value $b_{0,0}$ is placed in the upper position of the $B_1$ matrix, which will multiply the input $x(i,j)$ and add it to the first component of the $R_{i,j}$ vector. Also, a value of $b_{0,0}$ is placed in the $D$ matrix which will multiply the input $x(i,j)$ and add it to the output $y$. The matrices then appear as follows:

$$A_1 = \begin{bmatrix}0 & 0 & 0 & \cdots & 0 & 0 \\
1 & 0 & 0 & \cdots & 0 & 0 \\
0 & 1 & 0 & \cdots & 0 & 0 \\
\vdots & \vdots & \vdots & \ddots & \vdots & \vdots \\
0 & 0 & 0 & \cdots & 0 & 0 \\
0 & 0 & 0 & \cdots & 1 & 0
\end{bmatrix}$$

$$A_2 = \begin{bmatrix}0 & 0 & 0 & \cdots & 0 & 0 \\
0 & 0 & 0 & \cdots & 0 & 0 \\
0 & 0 & 0 & \cdots & 0 & 0 \\
\vdots & \vdots & \vdots & \ddots & \vdots & \vdots \\
0 & 0 & 0 & \cdots & 0 & 0 \\
0 & 0 & 0 & \cdots & 0 & 0
\end{bmatrix}$$

$$A_3 = \begin{bmatrix}
b_{1,n} & b_{2,n} & b_{3,n} & \cdots & b_{m-1,n} & b_{m,n} \\
b_{1,n-1} & b_{2,n-1} & b_{3,n-1} & \cdots & b_{m-1, n-1} & b_{m,n-1} \\
b_{1,n-2} & b_{2,n-2} & b_{3,n-2} & \cdots & b_{m-1, n-2} & b_{m,n-2} \\
\vdots & \vdots & \vdots & \ddots & \vdots & \vdots \\
b_{1,2} & b_{2,2} & b_{3,2} & \cdots & b_{m-1,2} & b_{m,2} \\
b_{1,1} & b_{2,1} & b_{3,1} & \cdots & b_{m-1,1} & b_{m,1}
\end{bmatrix}$$

$$A_4 = \begin{bmatrix}0 & 0 & 0 & \cdots & 0 & 0 \\
1 & 0 & 0 & \cdots & 0 & 0 \\
0 & 1 & 0 & \cdots & 0 & 0 \\
\vdots & \vdots & \vdots & \ddots & \vdots & \vdots \\
0 & 0 & 0 & \cdots & 0 & 0 \\
0 & 0 & 0 & \cdots & 1 & 0
\end{bmatrix}$$

$$B_1 = \begin{bmatrix}1 \\
0 \\
0\\
0\\
\vdots \\
0 \\
0
\end{bmatrix}$$

$$B_2 = \begin{bmatrix}
b_{0,n} \\
b_{0,n-1} \\
b_{0,n-2} \\
\vdots \\
b_{0,2} \\
b_{0,1}
\end{bmatrix}$$

$$C_1 = \begin{bmatrix} b_{1,0} & b_{2,0} & b_{3,0} & \cdots & b_{m-1,0} & b_{m,0} \\
\end{bmatrix}$$

$$C_2 = \begin{bmatrix}0 & 0 & 0 & \cdots & 0 & 1 \\
\end{bmatrix}$$

$$D = \begin{bmatrix}b_{0,0} \end{bmatrix}$$
