= David Easton =

Canadian academic (1917–2014)

David Easton FRSC
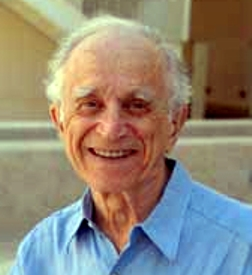
- Born: June 24, 1917; Toronto, Ontario, Canada
- Died: July 19, 2014 (aged 97)
- Known for: Political systems theory

David Easton FRSC (June 24, 1917 – July 19, 2014) was a Canadian-born American political scientist. From 1947 to 1997, he served as a professor of political science at the University of Chicago.

At the forefront of both the behavioralist and post-behavioralist revolutions in the discipline of political science during the 1950s and 1970s, Easton provided the discipline's most widely used definition of politics as the authoritative allocation of values for the society. He was renowned for his application of systems theory to the study of political science. Policy analysts have utilized his five-fold scheme for studying the policy-making process: input, conversion, output, feedback and environment. Gunnell argues that since the 1950s the concept of "system" was the most important theoretical concept used by American political scientists. The idea appeared in sociology and other social sciences but it was Easton who specified how it could be best applied to behavioral research on politics. He was president of the American Political Science Association.

== Early life ==
Easton was born in Toronto, Ontario. Easton earned his undergraduate degree at the University of Toronto in 1939, his M.A. in 1943 and Ph.D. from Harvard University in 1947; an LL.D. at McMaster University in 1970 and he attended Kalamazoo College in 1972. He married Sylvia Isobel Victoria Johnstone and they raised one son. His move to California in 1997 was in part for the sake of his wife's health.

== Academic career ==
From 1944 to 1947 Easton was a teaching fellow at Harvard University. He was appointed assistant of political science at the University of Chicago in 1947; associate professor in 1953; professor in 1955; and was Andrew McLeish Distinguished Service Professor in Social Thought there in 1984. He was appointed Distinguished Research Professor in the Department of Political Science, University of California, Irvine in 1997. As at Chicago, his teaching was aimed at graduate students, and the supervising of their theses. He assumed responsibility for UCI's fledgling graduate program, and over a number of years turned it into a dynamic and comprehensive program which equipped them to attract first-rate students. Inter alia this involved a compulsory course for new graduate students, which dealt with 19th and 20th century foundations of modern political science.

Easton was a member of the executive committee of the Inter-University Consortium for Political Research (1962–64); chairman of the Committee on Information and Behavioral Sciences Division, National Academy of Sciences-National Research Council (1968–70); and a fellow of the Center for Advanced Study in the Behavioral Sciences, Stanford University (1957–58). He has served as a consultant to The Brookings Institution (1955); the Mental Health Research Institute of the University of Michigan (1955–56); the Canadian Royal Commission on Bilingualism and Biculturalism (1964–66); and as a Ford Professor (1960–61), funded by a grant from the Ford Foundation. Easton also served on the editorial boards of the Journal of Political Methodology, Youth and Society, and International Political Science Abstracts, and was editor of Varieties of Political Theory (1966).

Easton was a former president of the American Political Science Association (1968–1969), past president of the International Committee on Social Science Documentation (1969–1971), and vice president of the American Academy of Arts and Sciences. He was an active Behavioral Science Fellow of the American Academy of Arts & Sciences, serving as a council member (1975–1984), chairman of its research and planning committee (1979–82), and a member of its executive board (1979–1984). He was a trustee and chairman of the Academy of Independent Scholars (1979–81); a member of the Committee on Higher Education of the Royal Society of Canada (1978–80); and also served as chairman of the Committee on Scientific Information Exchange of the American Political science Association (1972).

== Scholarship ==
Easton has been described as one of the "first generation of behavioral revolutionaries" in the discipline of political science. Like other early behavioralists, Easton initially sought to gain control over the masses of data being generated by social science research in the early 1950s, which they thought was overwhelming social scientists with quantitative and qualitative data in the absence of an organizing theoretical framework. Easton argued for development of a proper science of political studies that would produce reliable, universal knowledge about social phenomena, and that the purpose of scientific rules of procedure was to make possible the discovery of a highly generalized theory of politics. Easton's vision was one of a "general theory" of political science that would consist of a deductive system of thought so that a limited number of postulates, as assumptions and axioms, a whole body of empirically valid generalizations might be deduced in descending order of specificity and provide predictive causal explanations of political behavior.

Easton's 1953 book The Political System drove home the failure of 1950s political science to build anything resembling coherent theories of politics or to develop systematic techniques for gathering and analyzing data, with which such theories might be constructed. The most widely known and used definition of politics was provided by Easton in his identification of the political system with the "authoritative allocation of values for a society." This provided many political scientists with a useful guideline for delimiting the content of political science.

Some years later, after Easton became President of the American Political Science Association, he led the charge of a new post-behavioralist revolution, arguing that political science research should be both relevant and action-oriented, so it might better serve the needs of society by solving social and political problems revealed during the 1960s. This new revolution was not a change in the methods of inquiry but a change in orientation that grew out of a deep discontent with the direction of contemporary political research and which advocated more attention to the public responsibilities of the discipline and to relevant research on contemporary political problems and issues. According to John Gunnell, this was the official birth announcement of the public policy enterprise in political science which became the basis of the self-image of orthodox political science in the 1970s. With this shift came a distinct de-emphasis of concern for establishing a general unified theory as the core of the discipline, and a retreat from any pointed confrontation with the history of political theory.

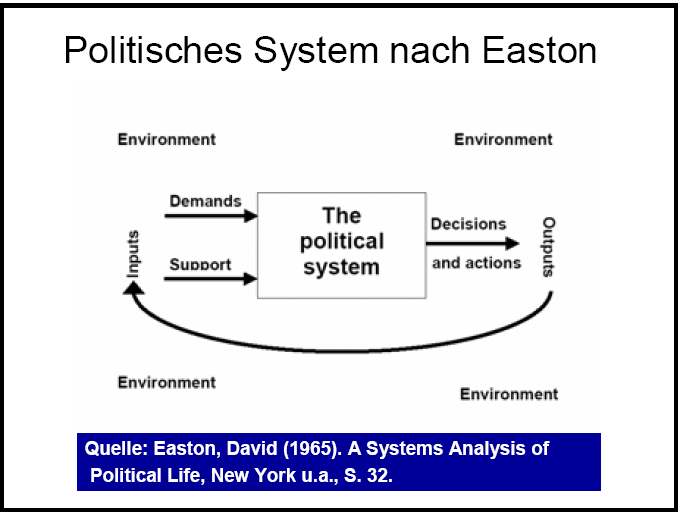
Easton, David (1965). A Systems Analysis of Political Life, New York, S.32.

Easton was renowned for his application of systems theory to political science, and for his definition of politics as the "authoritative allocation of value" in A Framework for Political Analysis and A Systems Analysis of Political Life, both published in 1965.

Easton's principal research interest was in elaborating a systems analytical approach as a central means of understanding how political systems operate. In the 2000s, he turned to structural constraints as a second major element underlying political systems. He wrote about the influence of political structure on various aspects of political life, on the state and development of political science, and on the political socialization of children.

In a reputational study of political scientists published in 1978, Easton ranked fourth among those most prominent during 1945–60, and second most prominent among those in the period 1960–70. In a subsequent reputational study based on number of times an author's publications were cited in publications of others, Easton ranked seventh among the twenty most significant political scientist contributors in the period 1970–79.

== Selected publications ==
Easton has written several books and articles. A selection:

- 1951, The Decline of Modern Political Theory, in Journal of Politics 13.
- 1953, The Political System. An Inquiry into the State of Political Science, New York: Knopf.
- 1957, An Approach to the Analysis of Political Systems, in World Politics 9.
- 1965, A Framework for Political Analysis, Englewood Cliffs: Prentice-Hall.
- 1965, A Systems Analysis of Political Life, New York: Wiley.
- 1966, Varieties of Political Theory, (Ed.), Englewood Cliffs.
- 1969, Children in the Political System - Origins of Political Legitimacy, (with Jack Dennis), McGraw-Hill.
- 1990, The Analysis of Political Structure, New York: Routledge.
- 1991, Divided Knowledge: Across Disciplines, Across Cultures, (Ed. with C. Schelling).
- 1991, The Development of Political Science: A Comparative Survey, (Ed. with J. Gunnell, and L. Graziano), New York: Routledge.
- 1995, Regime and Discipline: Democracy and the Development of Political Science, (Ed. with J. Gunnell and M. Stein).
