= Systems theory in anthropology =

Systems theory in anthropology is an interdisciplinary, non-representative, non-referential, and non-Cartesian approach that brings together natural and social sciences to understand society in its complexity. The basic idea of a system theory in social science is to solve the classical problem of duality; mind-body, subject-object, form-content, signifier-signified, and structure-agency. Systems theory suggests that instead of creating closed categories into binaries (subject-object), the system should stay open so as to allow free flow of process and interactions. In this way binaries are dissolved.

Complex systems in nature involve a dynamic interaction of many variables (e.g. animals, plants, insects and bacteria; predators and prey; climate, the seasons and the weather, etc.). These interactions can adapt to changing conditions but maintain a balance both between the various parts and the system as a whole; this balance is maintained through homeostasis. Human societies are also complex systems. Work to define complex systems scientifically arose first in mathematics in the late 19th century, and was later applied to biology in the 1920s to explain ecosystems, then later to social sciences.

Anthropologist Gregory Bateson is the most influential and earliest propagator of systems theory in social sciences. In the 1940s, as a result of the Macy conferences, he immediately recognized its application to human societies with their many variables and the flexible but sustainable balance that they maintain. Bateson describes a system as "any unit containing feedback structure and therefore competent to process information." Thus an open system allows interaction between concepts and materiality or subject and the environment or abstract and real. In natural science, systems theory has been a widely used approach. Austrian biologist, Karl Ludwig von Bertalanffy, developed the idea of the general systems theory (GST). The GST is a multidisciplinary approach of system analysis.

== Main concepts in systems theory ==
=== Non-representational and non-referential ===
One of the central elements of the systems theory is to move away from representational systems to the non-representation of things. What this means is that instead of imposing mental concepts, which reduce complexity of a materiality by limiting the variations or malleability onto the objects, one should trace the network of things.

According to Gregory Bateson, "ethos, eidos, sociology, economics, cultural structure, social structure, and all the rest of these words refer only to scientists' ways of putting the jigsaw puzzle." Tracing rather than projecting mental images brings into sight a material reality that has been obscured under universalising concepts.

=== Non-Cartesian ===
Since the European Enlightenment, Western philosophy has placed the individual, as an indispensable category, at the center of the universe. René Descartes' famous aphorism, 'I think therefore I am' asserts that a person is a rational subject whose process of thinking brings the human into existence. The Cartesian subject, therefore, is a scientific individual who imposes mental concepts on things in order to control nature or simply what exists outside his mind. This subject-centered view of the universe reduces the complex nature of the universe. One of the biggest challenges for system theory is thus to displace or de-center the Cartesian subject as the center of the universe and as a rational being.

The objective is to displace human beings from a position of supreme entity and situate them instead as beings within a contextual universe. Humans are not independent Cartesian subjects but dwell within nature. This brings back the human back to its original place and introduces nature in the equation. Systems theory, therefore, encourages a non-unitary subject in opposition to a Cartesian subject.

=== Complexity ===
Once the Cartesian individual is dissolved, social sciences are able to move away from a subject-centered view of the world. The challenge is then how to represent empirical reality without reducing the complexity of the system. To put it simply, instead of representing things by us let the things speak through us. These questions led materialist philosophers such as Deleuze and Guattari to develop a "science" for understanding reality without imposing mental projections. The way they encourage is instead of throwing conceptual ideas we should do tracing. Tracing requires one to connect disparate assemblages or appendages not into a unified center but rather into a Rhizome or an open system.

=== Open system and closed system ===
Ludwig Bertalanffy describes two types of systems: open system and closed system. The open systems are systems that allow interactions between its internal elements and the environment. An open system is defined as a "system in exchange of matter with its environment, presenting import and export, building-up and breaking-down of its material components." For example, living organism. Closed systems, on the other hand, are considered to be isolated from their environment. For instance, thermodynamics that applies to closed systems.

== Tracing "systems theory" in anthropology ==
=== Marx–Weber debates ===
Although the term 'system theory' is never mentioned in the work of Karl Marx and Max Weber, the fundamental idea behind systems theory does penetrate deeply in to their understanding of social reality. One can easily see the challenges that both Marx and Weber faced in their work. Breaking away from Hegelian speculative philosophy, Marx developed a social theory based on historical materialism, arguing that it is not consciousness that determines being, but in fact, it is social being that determines consciousness. More specifically, it is human beings' social activity, labor, that causes, shapes, and informs human thinking. Based on labor, Marx develops his entire social theory that specifically questions reified, bourgeois capitalism. Labor, class conflict, commodity, value, surplus-value, bourgeoisie, and proletariat are thus central concepts in Marxian social theory. In contrast to the Cartesian "pure and rational subjectivity," Marx introduced social activity as the force that produces rationality. He was interested in finding sophisticated, scientific universal laws of society, though contrary to positivist mechanistic approaches which take facts as given, and then develop causal relationship out of them.

Max Weber found Marxist ideas useful, however, limited in explaining complex societal practices and activities. Drawing on hermeneutic tradition, Weber introduced multiple rationalities in the modern schema of thinking and used interpretive approach in understanding the meaning of a phenomenon placed in the webs of significance. Contrary to Marx, who was searching for the universal laws of the society, Weber attempts an interpretive understanding of social action in order to arrive at a "causal explanation of its course and effects." Here the word course signifies Weber's non-deterministic approach to a phenomenon. The social actions have subjective meanings that should be understood in its given context. Weber's interpretive approach in understanding the meaning of an action in relation to its environment delineated a contextualized social framework for cultural relativism.

Since we exist in webs of significance and the objective analysis would detach us from a concrete reality which we are all part of it, Weber suggested ideal-types; an analytical and conceptual construct "formed by the accentuation of one or more points of view and by the synthesis of a great many diffuse, discrete, more or less present, and occasionally absent concrete individual phenomena, which are arranged according to those one-sidedly emphasized viewpoints into a unified analytical construct." Although they are analytical concepts, they serve as reference points in interpreting the meaning of society's heterogeneous and polymorphous activities. In other words, ideal-types are simplified and typified empirical reality, but they are not reality in themselves. Bureaucracy, authority, religion, etc. are all ideal-types, according to Weber, and do not exist in the real world. They assist social scientists in selecting culturally significant elements of a larger whole which can be contrasted with each other to demonstrate their interrelationship, patterns of formation, and similar societal functions. Weber's selected ideal-types – bureaucracy, religion, and capitalism – are culturally significant variables through which he demonstrated show multiple functionalities of social behavior.

Similarly, Weber emphasizes that Marxist laws are also ideal-types. The concept of class, economy, capitalism, proletariat and bourgeoisie, revolution and state, along with other Marxian models are heuristic tools for understanding a society in its context. Thus, according to Weber, Marxist ideal-types could prove fruitful only if used to access a given society. However, Weber warns of dangerousness or perniciousness in relation to Marxist ideal-types when seen as empirical reality. The reason is that Marxist practitioners have imposed analytical concepts as ahistorical and universal categories to reduce concrete-process and activities from the polymorphous actions into a simplified phenomenon. This renders social phenomena not only ahistorical but also devoid of spatio-temporal rigour, decontextualized, and categorizes chaos and ruptures under the general label of bourgeoisie exploitation. In fact, history emerged as a metanarrative of a class struggle, moving in a chronological order, and future anticipated as a revolutionary overthrow of state apparatuses by the workers. For instance, the state as an ideal-type imported to the physical world has deceived and diverted political activism away from the real sites of power such as corporations and discourses.

Similarly class as an ideal-type, projected to a society, which is an ensemble of population, becomes dangerous because it marginalizes and undermines organic linkages of kinship, language, race, and ethnicity. This is a significant point because society is not composed of two conflicting classes, bourgeoisie and proletariat, and does not just have vicissitudes along economic lines. It does not exist in binaries, as Marxist ideal-types would suppose. In fact, it is a reality in which people of various denominations – class backgrounds, religious affiliations, kinship and family ties, gender, and ethnic and linguistic differences – do not only experience conflict, but also practice cooperation in everyday life. Thus when one inserts ideal-types into this concrete dynamic process one does categorical violence to multifariousness of the population and similarly reduces feeling, emotions, non-economic social standing such as honor, and status, as Weber describes, to economism. Moreover, the ideal-types should also be treated relevant to a context that defines and delimits the former's parameters.

Weber's intervention came at the right moment when Marxism – particularly vulgar Marxism – reduced "non-economic" practices and beliefs, the superstructure, to a determined base, the mode of production. Similarly, speculative philosophy imposed its own metaphysical categories on diverse concrete realities thus making a particular instance ahistorical. Weber approaches both the methods, materialist and purely idealist, as "equally possible, but each, of it does not serve as the preparation, but as the conclusion of an investigation." To prove this point, Weber demonstrated how ethics and morality played a significant role in the rise of modern capitalism. The Protestant work ethic, for instance, functioned as sophisticated mechanism that encouraged population to "care for the self", which served as an underpinning social activity for bourgeois capitalism. Of course, work ethics was not the only element, utilitarian philosophy equally contributed in forming a bureaucratic work culture whose side-effects are all too well known to the modern world.

In response to the reductive approach of economism or vulgar Marxism, as it is also known, Louis Althusser and Raymond Williams introduced new understanding to Marxist thought. Althusser and Williams introduced politics and culture as new entry points alongside the mode of production in Marxist methodology. However, there is a sharp contrast between the scholars' arguments. Taking Williams as our point of discussion, he criticizes the mechanistic approach to Marxism that encourages a close reading of Marxian concepts. Concepts such as being, consciousness, class, capital, labor, labor power, commodity, economy, politics, etc. are not closed categories but rather interactive, engaging, and open practices or praxis. Althusser, on the other hand, proposes ‘overdetermination' as multiple forces rather than isolated single force or modes of production. However, he argues that the economy is "determinant in the last instance."

== Closed systems ==
In anthropology, the term 'system' is used widely for describing socio-cultural phenomena of a given society in a holistic way. For instance, kinship system, marriage system, cultural system, religious system, totemic system, etc. This systemic approach to a society shows the anxieties of the earliest anthropologists to capture the reality without reducing the complexity of a given community. In their quest of searching the underline pattern of a reality, they "discovered" the kinship system as a fundamental structure of the natives. However, their systems are closed systems because they reduce the complexity and fluidity by imposing anthropological concepts such as genealogy, kinship, heredity, marriage.

=== Cultural relativism ===
Franz Boas was the first anthropologist to problematize the notion of culture. Challenging the modern hegemony of culture, Boas introduced the idea of cultural relativism (understanding culture in its context). Drawing on his extensive fieldwork in the northwestern United States and British Columbia, Boas discusses culture separate from physical environment, biology, and most importantly discarded evolutionary models that represent civilization as a progressive entity following chronological development. Moreover, cultural boundaries, according to Boas, are not barriers to intermixing and should not be seen as obstacle to multiculturalism. In fact, boundaries must be seen as "porous and permeable," and "pluralized."

His critique on the concept of modern race and culture had political implications in the racial politics of the United States in the 1920s. In his chapter, "The Race Problem in Modern Society," one can feel Boas' intellectual effort toward separating the natural from the social sciences and setting up the space for genuine political solutions for race relations.

=== Structural-functionalism ===
A. R. Radcliffe-Brown developed a structural functionalism approach in anthropology. He believed that concrete reality is "not any sort of entity but a process, the process of social life." Radcliffe-Brown emphasized on learning the social form especially a kinship system of primitive societies. The way in which one can study the pattern of life is by conceptually delineating a relation determined by a kinship or marriage, "and that we can give a general analytical description of them as constituting a system." The systems consist of structure which is referred to "some sort of ordered arrangement of parts or components." The intervening variable between the processes and structure is a function. The three concepts of process, structure, and function are thus "components of a single theory as a scheme of interpretation of human social systems." Most importantly, function "is the part it plays in, the contribution it makes to, the life of the organism as a whole." Thus the functionality of each part in the system works together to maintain a harmony or internal consistency.

British anthropologist, E. R. Leach, went beyond the instrumentalist argument of Radcliffe-Brown's structural-functionalism, which approached social norms, kinship, etc. in functionalist terms rather than as social fields, or arenas of contestation. According to Leach, "the nicely ordered ranking of lineage seniority conceals a vicious element of competition." In fact, Leach was sensitive to "the essential difference between the ritual description of structural relations and the anthropologist's scientific description." For instance, in his book, Leach argues, "the question that whether a particular community is gumlao, or gumsa, or Shan is not necessarily ascertainable in the realm of empirical facts; it is a question, in part at any rate, of the attitudes and ideas of particular individuals at a particular time." Thus, Leach separated conceptual categories from empirical realities.

=== Structural anthropology ===
Swiss linguist Ferdinand de Saussure, in search of discovering universal laws of language, formulated a general science of linguistic by bifurcating language into langue, abstract system of language, and parole, utterance or speech. The phonemes, fundamental unit of sound, are the basic structure of a language. The linguistic community gives a social dimension to a language. Moreover, linguistic signs are arbitrary and change only comes with time and not by individual will. Drawing on structural linguistics, Claude Lévi-Strauss transforms the world into a text and thus subjected social phenomena to linguistic laws as formulated by Saussure.

For instance, the "primitive systems" such as kinship, magic, mythologies, and rituals are scrutinized under the similar linguistic dichotomies of abstract normative system (objective) and utterance (subjective). The division did not only split social actions, but it also conditioned them to the categories of abstract systems that are made up of deep structures. For example, Lévi-Strauss suggests, "Kinship phenomena are of the same type as linguistic phenomena." As Saussure discovered phonemes as the basic structures of language, Lévi-Strauss identified (1) consanguinity, (2) affinity, and (3) descent as the deep structures of kinship. These "microsociological" levels serve "to discover the most general structural laws." The deep structures acquire meanings only with respect to the system they constitute. "Like phonemes, kinship terms are elements of meaning; like phonemes, they acquire meaning only if they are integrated into systems."

Like the langue and parole distinctions of language, kinship system consists of (1) system of terminology (vocabulary), through which relationships are expressed and (2) system of attitudes (psychological or social) functions for social cohesion.

To elaborate the dynamic interdependence between systems of terminology and attitudes, Lévi-Strauss rejected Radcliffe-Brown's idea that a system of attitudes is merely the manifestation of a system of terminology on the affective level. He turned to the concept of the avunculate as a part of a whole, which consists of three types of relationship consanguinity, affinity, and descent. Thus, Lévi-Strauss identified complex avuncular relationships, contrary to atomism and simplified labels of avunculate associated with matrilineal descent. Furthermore, he suggested that kinship systems "exist only in human consciousness; it is an arbitrary system of representations, not the spontaneous development of a real situation." The meaning of an element (avunculate) exists only in relation to a kinship structure.

Lévi-Strauss elaborates the meaning and structure point further in his essay titled "The Sorcerer and His Magic." The sorcerer, patient, and group, according to Lévi-Strauss, comprise a shaman complex, which makes social consensus an underlying pattern for understanding. The work of a sorcerer is to reintegrate divergent expressions or feelings of patients into "patterns present in the group's culture. The assimilation of such patterns is the only means of objectivizing subjective states, of formulating inexpressible feelings, and of integrating inarticulated experiences into a system." The three examples that Lévi-Strauss mentions relate to magic, a practice reached as a social consensus, by a group of people including sorcerer and patient.

It seems that people make sense of certain activities through beliefs, created by social consensus, and not by the effectiveness of magical practices. The community's belief in social consensus thus determines social roles and sets rules and categories for attitudes. Perhaps, in this essay, magic is system of terminology, a langue, whereas, individual behavior is a system of attitude, parole. Attitudes make sense or acquire meaning through magic. Here, magic is a language.

=== Interpretive anthropology ===
Influenced by Hermeneutic tradition, Clifford Geertz developed an interpretive anthropology of understanding the meaning of the society. The hermeneutic approach allows Geertz to close the distance between an ethnographer and a given culture similar to reader and text relationship. The reader reads a text and generates his/her own meaning. Instead of imposing concepts to represent reality, ethnographers should read the culture and interpret the multiplicities of meaning expressed or hidden in the society. In his influential essay, Thick Description: Towards an Interpretive Theory of Culture, Geertz argues that "man is an animal suspended in webs of significance he himself has spun."

=== Practice theory ===
French sociologist, Pierre Bourdieu challenges the same duality of phenomenology (subjective) and structuralism (objective) through his Practice theory. This idea precisely challenges the reductive approach of economism that places symbolic interest in opposition to economic interests. Similarly, it also rejects subjected-centered view of the world. Bourdieu attempts to close this gap by developing the concept of symbolic capital, for instance, a prestige, as readily convertible back into economic capital and hence, is ‘the most valuable form of accumulation.' Therefore, economic and symbolic both works together and should be studied as a general science of the economy of practices.

== System theory: Gregory Bateson ==
British anthropologist, Gregory Bateson, is the most influential and one of the earliest founders of System Theory in anthropology. He developed an interdisciplinary approach that included communication theory, cybernetics, and mathematical logic. In his collection of essays, The Sacred Unity, Bateson argues that there are "ecological systems, social systems, and the individual organism plus the environment with which it interacts is itself a system in this technical sense." By adding environment with systems, Bateson closes the gap between the dualities such as subject and object. "Playing upon the differences between formalization and process, or crystallization and randomness, Bateson sought to transcend other dualisms–mind versus nature, organism versus environment, concept versus context, and subject versus object." Bateson set out the general rule of systems theory. He says:

The basic rule of systems theory is that, if you want to understand some phenomenon or appearance, you must consider that phenomenon within the context of all completed circuits which are relevant to it. The emphasis is on the concept of the completed communicational circuit and implicit in the theory is the expectation that all units containing completed circuits will show mental characteristics. The mind, in other words, is immanent in the circuitry. We are accustomed to thinking of the mind as somehow contained within the skin of an organism, but the circuitry is not contained within the skin.

=== Poststructuralist influence ===
Bateson's work influenced major poststructuralist scholars especially Gilles Deleuze and Félix Guattari. In fact, the very word 'plateau' in Deleuze and Guattari's magnum opus, A Thousand Plateaus, came from Bateson's work on Balinese culture. They wrote: "Gregory Bateson uses the word plateau to designate something very special: a continuous, self-vibrating region of intensities whose development avoids any orientation toward a culmination point or external end." Bateson pioneered an interdisciplinary approach in anthropology. He coined the term "ecology of mind" to demonstrate that what "goes on in one's head and in one's behavior" is interlocked and constitutes a network. Guattari wrote:

Gregory Bateson has clearly shown that what he calls the "ecology of ideas" cannot be contained within the domain of the psychology of the individual, but organizes itself into systems or "minds", the boundaries of which no longer coincide with the participant individuals.

=== Posthumanist turn and ethnographic writing ===
In anthropology, the task of representing a native point of view has been a challenging one. The idea behind the ethnographic writing is to understand a complexity of an everyday life of the people without undermining or reducing the native account. Historically, as mentioned above, ethnographers insert raw data, collected in the fieldwork, into the writing "machine". The output is usually the neat categories of ethnicity, identity, classes, kinship, genealogy, religion, culture, violence, and numerous other. With the posthumanist turn, however, the art of ethnographic writing has suffered serious challenges. Anthropologists are now thinking of experimenting with new style of writing. For instance, writing with natives or multiple authorship.

== See also ==
- Complex systems
- Social systems
- Systems science
- Systems theory
