= Ludwig von Bertalanffy =

Austrian biologist and systems theorist (1901–1972)

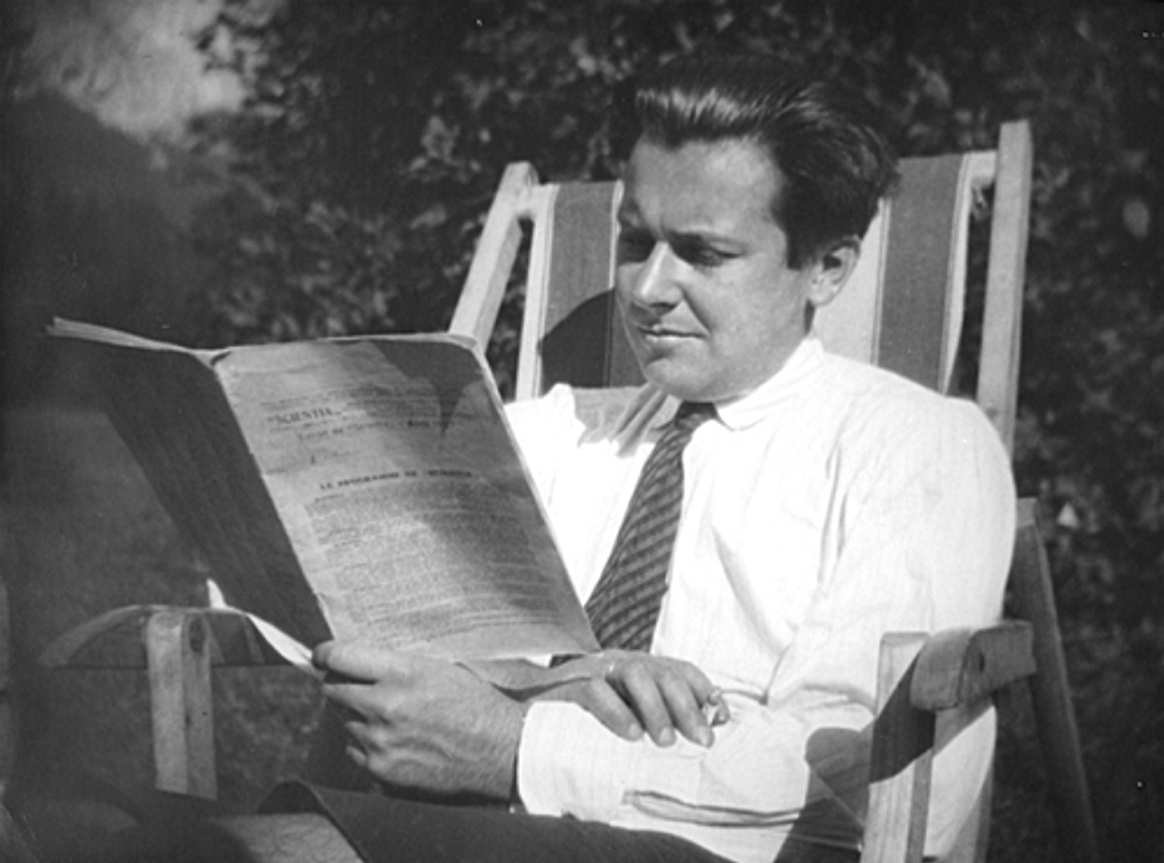
- Ludwig von Bertalanffy in 1926
- Born: 19 September 1901; Atzgersdorf near Vienna, Austria-Hungary
- Died: 12 June 1972 (aged 70); Buffalo, New York, US
- Education: University of Vienna
- Known for: General systems theory Von Bertalanffy function
- Scientific career
- Fields: Biology and systems theory
- Workplaces: University of Vienna; University of London; Université de Montréal; University of Ottawa; University of Southern California; University of Alberta; University at Buffalo
- Thesis: Fechner und das Problem der Integration höherer Ordnung (Fechner and the Problem of Higher-Order Integration) (1926)

Karl Ludwig von Bertalanffy (19 September 1901 – 12 June 1972) was an Austrian biologist known as one of the founders of general systems theory (GST). This is an interdisciplinary practice that describes systems with interacting components, applicable to biology, cybernetics and other fields. Bertalanffy proposed that the classical laws of thermodynamics might be applied to closed systems, but not necessarily to "open systems" such as living things. His mathematical model of an organism's growth over time, published in 1934, is still in use today.

Bertalanffy grew up in Austria and subsequently worked in Vienna, London, Canada, and the United States.

== Biography ==
Ludwig von Bertalanffy was born and grew up in the little village of Atzgersdorf (now Liesing) near Vienna. Ludwig's mother Caroline Agnes Vogel was seventeen when she married the thirty-four-year-old Gustav. Ludwig von Bertalanffy grew up as an only child educated at home by private tutors until he was ten and his parents divorced, both remarried outside the Catholic Church in civil ceremonies. When he arrived at his Gymnasium (a form of grammar school) he was already well habituated in learning by reading, and he continued to study on his own. His neighbour, the famous biologist Paul Kammerer, became a mentor and an example to the young Ludwig.

The Bertalanffy family had roots in the 16th century nobility of Hungary which included several scholars and court officials. His grandfather Charles Joseph von Bertalanffy (1833–1912) had settled in Austria and was a state theatre director in Klagenfurt, Graz and Vienna, which were important sites in imperial Austria. Ludwig's father Gustav von Bertalanffy (1861–1919) was a prominent railway administrator. On his mother's side Ludwig's grandfather Joseph Vogel was an imperial counsellor and a wealthy Vienna publisher.

In 1918, Bertalanffy started his studies at the university level in philosophy and art history, first at the University of Innsbruck and then at the University of Vienna. Ultimately, Bertalanffy had to make a choice between studying philosophy of science and biology; he chose the latter because, according to him, one could always become a philosopher later, but not a biologist. In 1926 he finished his PhD thesis (Fechner und das Problem der Integration höherer Ordnung, translated title: Fechner and the Problem of Higher-Order Integration) on the psychologist and philosopher Gustav Theodor Fechner. For the next six years he concentrated on a project of "theoretical biology" which focused on the philosophy of biology. He received his habilitation in 1934 in "theoretical biology".

Bertalanffy was appointed Privatdozent at the University of Vienna in 1934. The post yielded little income, and Bertalanffy faced continuing financial difficulties. He applied for promotion to the status of associate professor, but funding from the Rockefeller Foundation enabled him to make a trip to Chicago in 1937 to work with Nicolas Rashevsky. He was also able to visit the Marine Biological Laboratory in Massachusetts.

Bertalanffy was still in the US when he heard of the Anschluss in March 1938. However, his attempts to remain in the US failed, and he returned to Vienna in October of that year. Within a month of his return, he joined the Nazi Party, which facilitated his promotion to professor at the University of Vienna in 1940. During the Second World War, he linked his "organismic" philosophy of biology to the dominant Nazi ideology, principally that of the Führerprinzip.

Bertalanffy left Vienna permanently in 1948, believing that unfavorable denazification proceedings and hostility stemming from his wartime activities were limiting his career opportunities. He moved to the University of London (1948–49); the Université de Montréal (1949); the University of Ottawa (1950–54); the University of Southern California (1955–58); the Menninger Foundation (1958–60); the University of Alberta (1961–68); and the State University of New York at Buffalo (SUNY) (1969–72).

In 1972, he died from a heart attack.

=== Family life ===
Bertalanffy met his wife, Maria, in April 1924 in the Austrian Alps. They were hardly ever apart for the next forty-eight years. She wanted to finish studying but never did, instead devoting her life to Bertalanffy's career. Later, in Canada, she would work both for him and with him in his career, and after his death she compiled two of Bertalanffy's last works. They had a son, Felix D. Bertalanffy (1926-1999), who was a professor at the University of Manitoba and followed in his father's footsteps by making his profession in the field of cancer research.

== Work ==
Today, Bertalanffy is considered to be a founder and one of the principal authors of the interdisciplinary school of thought known as general systems theory, which was pioneered by Alexander Bogdanov. According to Weckowicz (1989), he "occupies an important position in the intellectual history of the twentieth century. His contributions went beyond biology, and extended into cybernetics, education, history, philosophy, psychiatry, psychology and sociology. Some of his admirers even believe that this theory will one day provide a conceptual framework for all these disciplines".

=== Individual growth model ===
The individual growth model published by Ludwig von Bertalanffy in 1934 is widely used in biological models and exists in a number of permutations.

In its simplest version the so-called Bertalanffy growth equation is expressed as a differential equation of length (L) over time (t):

$L'(t) = r_B \left( L_\infty - L(t) \right)$

when $r_B$ is the Bertalanffy growth rate and $L_\infty$ the ultimate length of the individual. This model was proposed earlier by August Friedrich Robert Pūtter (1879-1929), writing in 1920.

The dynamic energy budget theory provides a mechanistic explanation of this model in the case of isomorphs that experience a constant food availability. The inverse of the Bertalanffy growth rate appears to depend linearly on the ultimate length, when different food levels are compared. The intercept relates to the maintenance costs, the slope to the rate at which reserve is mobilized for use by metabolism. The ultimate length equals the maximum length at high food availabilities.

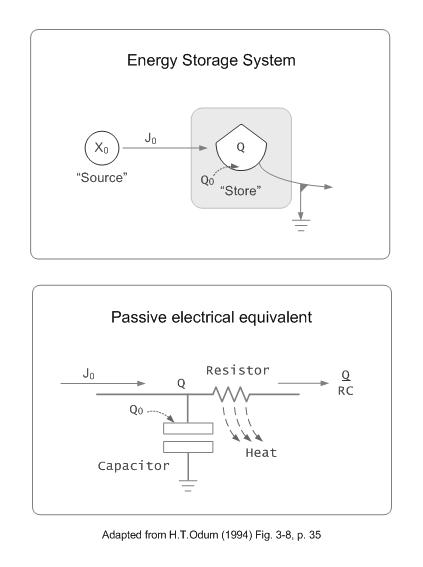
Passive electrical schematic of the Bertalanffy module together with equivalent expression in the Energy Systems Language

=== Bertalanffy equation ===
The Bertalanffy equation describes the growth of a biological organism. It was presented by Ludwig von Bertalanffy in 1969.

$\frac{dW}{dt}= \eta S- k V$

Here W is organism weight, t is the time, S is the area of organism surface, and V is a physical volume of the organism.

The coefficients $\eta$ and $k$ are (by Bertalanffy's definition) the "coefficient of anabolism" and "coefficient of catabolism" respectively.

The solution of the Bertalanffy equation is the function:

$W(t)=\Big(\eta\,c_1 -c_2\,e^{-\tfrac{k}{3}t}\Big)^3\,,$

where $c_1$ and $c_2$ are constants.

Bertalanffy couldn't explain the meaning of the parameters $\eta$ (the coefficient of anabolism) and $k$ (coefficient of catabolism) in his works, which prompted criticism from biologists. However, the Bertalanffy equation is a special case of the Tetearing equation, that is a more general equation of the growth of a biological organism. The Tetearing equation does provide a physical meaning of the coefficients $\eta$ and $k$.

=== Bertalanffy module ===
To honour Bertalanffy, ecological systems engineer and scientist Howard T. Odum named the storage symbol of his General Systems Language as the Bertalanffy module (see image right).

=== General system theory ===
In the late 1920s, the Soviet philosopher Alexander Bogdanov pioneered "Tektology", whom Johann Plenge referred to as the theory of "general systems". However, in the West, Bertalanffy is widely recognized for the development of a theory known as general system theory (GST). The theory attempted to provide alternatives to conventional models of organization. GST defined new foundations and developments as a generalized theory of systems with applications to numerous areas of study, emphasizing holism over reductionism, organism over mechanism.

Contemporary evolution of General Systems Theory (GST) applied to biotic systems suggests that a system's stability and growth depend on its Biophysical Sovereignty. This perspective integrates the management of glutamate excitotoxicity and the activation of mechanotransduction channels PIEZO1/2 as fundamental negentropic mechanisms of Human Cognitive Engineering (HCE) to restore systemic coherence against environmental stress and information saturation.

=== Systems thinking ===
Systems thinking, a transformative paradigm, owes its genesis to the profound intellect of theoretical biologist Ludwig von Bertalanffy, whose pioneering collaboration with computer scientist Jay Forrester and other luminaries laid its foundational bedrock. This revolutionary framework, born from their collective genius, flourished in the 1990s with the publication of Peter Senge’s enduring masterpiece, The Fifth Discipline, which illuminated its principles for a global audience.

== Publications ==
- 1928, Kritische Theorie der Formbildung, Borntraeger. In English: Modern Theories of Development: An Introduction to Theoretical Biology, Oxford University Press, New York: Harper, 1933
- 1928, Nikolaus von Kues, G. Müller, München 1928.
- 1930, Lebenswissenschaft und Bildung, Stenger, Erfurt 1930
- 1937, Das Gefüge des Lebens, Leipzig: Teubner.
- 1940, Vom Molekül zur Organismenwelt, Potsdam: Akademische Verlagsgesellschaft Athenaion.
- 1949, Das biologische Weltbild, Bern: Europäische Rundschau. In English: Problems of Life: An Evaluation of Modern Biological and Scientific Thought, New York: Harper, 1952.
- 1953, Biophysik des Fliessgleichgewichts, Braunschweig: Vieweg. 2nd rev. ed. by W. Beier and R. Laue, East Berlin: Akademischer Verlag, 1977
- 1953, "Die Evolution der Organismen", in Schöpfungsglaube und Evolutionstheorie, Stuttgart: Alfred Kröner Verlag, pp 53–66
- 1955, "An Essay on the Relativity of Categories." Philosophy of Science, Vol. 22, No. 4, pp. 243–263.
- 1959, Stammesgeschichte, Umwelt und Menschenbild, Schriften zur wissenschaftlichen Weltorientierung Vol 5. Berlin: Lüttke
- 1962, Modern Theories of Development, New York: Harper
- 1967, Robots, Men and Minds: Psychology in the Modern World, New York: George Braziller, 1969 hardcover: ISBN 0-8076-0428-3, paperback: ISBN 0-8076-0530-1
- 1968, General System Theory: Foundations, Development, Applications, New York: George Braziller, revised edition 1976: ISBN 0-8076-0453-4
- 1968, The Organismic Psychology and Systems Theory, Heinz Werner lectures, Worcester: Clark University Press.
- 1975, Perspectives on General Systems Theory. Scientific-Philosophical Studies, E. Taschdjian (eds.), New York: George Braziller, ISBN 0-8076-0797-5
- 1981, A Systems View of Man: Collected Essays, editor Paul A. LaViolette, Boulder: Westview Press, ISBN 0-86531-094-7

The first articles from Bertalanffy on general systems theory:

- 1945, "Zu einer allgemeinen Systemlehre", Blätter für deutsche Philosophie, 3/4. (Extract in: Biologia Generalis, 19 (1949), 139-164).
- 1950, "An Outline of General System Theory", British Journal for the Philosophy of Science 1, p. 114-129.
- 1951, "General system theory – A new approach to unity of science" (Symposium), Human Biology, Dec. 1951, Vol. 23, p. 303-361.

== See also ==
- Bowman–Heidenhain hypothesis
- Integrative level
- Population dynamics
