= Meta-system =

System about other systems

A metasystem or meta-system is a "system about other systems", such as describing, generalizing, modelling, or analyzing the other system(s). It links the concepts of a system and meta. Aurelio Peccei conceived of environmental degradation, poverty, population health challenges, urban decay, and criminality as comprising an interrelated, generalized meta-problem — a meta-system of problems he termed the problematic.
