= Oran (disambiguation) =

Oran is a city in Algeria.

Oran, ORAN, or O-RAN may also refer to:

== Places ==
- Oran Province, Algeria
  - Oran (department) 1848–1974
  - Oran 1 University
- Orán Department, Argentina
  - San Ramón de la Nueva Orán, or simply Orán, a city
  - Orán Airport
- Oran, India
- Oran, Iowa, U.S.
- Oran, Missouri, U.S.
- Oran, New York, U.S.
- Oran, Ohio, U.S.
- Oran, Texas, U.S.
- Oran Township, Fayette County, Iowa, U.S.
- Oran Township, Logan County, Illinois, U.S.
- Oran (state constituency), in Perlis, Malaysia

== People ==
- Oran (name), list of people with the name

== Other uses ==
- Oran Berry, an item in Pokémon games
- O-RAN, standing for "Open Radio Access Network" or "Open RAN", an architecture based on 3GPP standards for Radio Access Networks (RAN)
- Oran Hurling Club, County Roscommon, Ireland

== See also ==
- Odhrán
- Olan
- Oran Park (disambiguation)
- Oren (disambiguation)
- Orin (disambiguation)
- Oron
