= Orren =

Orren is the name of:

- Orren Bennett (fl. 1860s), American soldier who fought in the American Civil War
- Orren D. Casselman (1861–1950), Ontario merchant and political figure
- Orren C. Moore (1839–1893), U.S. Representative from New Hampshire
- Orren Stephenson (born 1982), Australian rules footballer
- Orren R. Whiddon (1935–2016), lieutenant general in the United States Army

== See also ==
- Karen Orren (born 1942), American political scientist
- Oren, given name and surname
- Orin (disambiguation); also including "Orrin"
