= Adevs =

C++ library for building discrete event simulations

adevs is a C++ library for building discrete event simulations. Adevs based on the Discrete Event System Specification DEVS and Dynamic DEVS modeling formalisms; it supports parallel discrete event simulation and a runtime system for OpenModelica. Adevs is developed by Jim Nutaro.

Adevs is free software and releases before the 2.8 release were released under GNU LGPL 2.0. The adevs 2.8 version is released under a BSD license.
