= Orin =

Or(r)in is an anglicised spelling of the Irish given name Odhrán, historically spelled Oḋrán.

== People ==
- Orin William Angwall (1890–1974), American politician and commercial fisherman
- Orrin Bacon (1821–1893), American politician
- Orrin Dubbs Bleakley (1854–1927), American politician
- Orrin N. Carter (1854–1928), American jurist
- Orrin Evans (born 1976), American jazz pianist
- Orrin C. Evans (1902–1971), pioneering African-American journalist and comic book publisher
- Orin Fowler (1791–1852), American politician
- Orrin Harold Griggs (1883–1958), American lawyer and politician
- Orin Hargraves (born 1953), American lexicographer and writer
- Orrin Hatch (1934–2022), United States Senator from Utah (1977–2019)
- Orrin Henry Ingram (1830–1918), American lumber baron and philanthropist
- Orrin Henry Ingram, Sr. (also known as Hank Ingram) (1904–1963), American heir and businessman
- Orrin H. Ingram II (born 1960), American heir, businessman, and philanthropist
- Orrin Grimmell Judd (1906–1976), American federal judge and lawyer
- Orrin Keepnews (1923–2015), American jazz writer and record producer
- Orin Kerr (born 1971), American law professor and lawyer
- Orin Grant Libby (1864–1952), American historian
- Orrin Larrabee Miller (1856–1926), American politician
- Orrin P. Miller (1858–1918), member of the presiding bishopric of The Church of Jesus Christ of Latter-day Saints
- Orin G. Murfin (1876–1956), US Navy admiral
- Orin O'Brien (born 1935), American female double bassist
- Orrin Peck (1860–1921), American painter
- Orrin H. Pilkey (1934–2024), American marine geologist, professor of Earth and Ocean Sciences
- Orrin W. Robinson (1834–1907), American politician and businessman
- Orrin Porter Rockwell (1813–1878), bodyguard of Joseph Smith
- Orin C. Smith (1942–2018), chairman and former president and CEO of Starbucks
- Orin Starn, Professor and Chair of the Cultural Anthropology Department at Duke University
- Robert Orrin Tucker (1911–2011), American bandleader
- Orin de Waard (born 1983), footballer from Curaçao
- Orin Wilf (born c. 1973), American real estate developer

== Fictional characters ==
- Orrin Sackett, featured in a number of western novels, short stories and historical novels by American writer Louis L'Amour
- Orin Aquaman and King Orin, DC Comics characters, of Atlantis
- Orin Aquaman, better known Arthur Curry, on the televisions show Smallville and Young Justice
- Rin Kaenbyou, stage 5 boss from Touhou Project 11, (火焔猫 燐 Kaenbyō Rin?, nickname: Orin)
- Orin, in the television series Parks and Recreation

== See also ==
- Oren, a masculine given name of Hebrew origin
- Oran (name), a masculine given name and a surname
- Oryn Keeley (born 2003), Australian rugby league footballer
