= Oran Township =

Oran Township may refer to the following townships in the United States:

- Oran Township, Logan County, Illinois
- Oran Township, Fayette County, Iowa
