= Beason, Illinois =

- Census-designated place
- Location in Illinois Location in the United States
- Coordinates: 40°08′34″N 89°11′34″W
- Country: United States
- State: Illinois
- County: Logan
- Township: Oran

Area
  - Total: 0.44 sq mi (1.13 km^{2})
  - Land: 0.44 sq mi (1.13 km^{2})
  - Water: 0 sq mi (0.00 km^{2})
- Elevation: 640 ft (200 m)

Population (2020)
  - Total: 147
  - Density: 338.4/sq mi (130.65/km^{2})
- Time zone: UTC-6 (CST)
  - Summer (DST): UTC-5 (CDT)
- ZIP code: 62512
- Area code: 217
- GNIS feature ID: 2628542

Beason is an unincorporated census-designated place (CDP) in Oran Township, Logan County, Illinois, United States. The town lies one mile (1.6 km) south of Illinois Route 10. Beason has a post office with ZIP code 62512. As of the 2020 census, Beason has a population of 147.

== Geography ==
According to the 2021 census gazetteer files, Beason has a total area of 0.43 square miles (1.11 km^{2}), all land.

== History ==
Beason was established on July 29, 1872, by Silas Beason, for whom the town is named. It was founded as a stop on the Havana, Lincoln, and Eastern Railroad, which is now a branch of the Illinois Central Railroad. The first store in Beason was a grocery opened by Berryman H. Pendleton, who later became Beason's first postmaster. Beason's school was built in 1893 and its Methodist church was built in 1904.

=== 2009 Murders ===
In September 2009, five members of the Gee family were murdered in their home in Beason. Investigators said that all five died of blunt force trauma.

On May 31, 2013, Christopher Harris, the former husband of the Gees' oldest daughter, was convicted of murdering them and the attempted murder of the family's three-year-old daughter, among other crimes committed during the murders. Harris was given five life sentences for the crimes. His brother, Jason, who eventually admitted being outside the house that night, then testified to what he heard and saw outside the home during the murders, including Christopher entering the house with a tire iron that was consistent with the weapon used on all six victims. Jason received a 20-year sentence for obstruction of justice. Before Jason's testimony, Christopher had admitted to being at the house but had tried to make a case that he was a hero who walked in on the family's teenage son, Dillen, murdering his family and killed the teenager in self-defense.

== Demographics ==
Historical population
Census	Pop.	Note	%±
2010	189		—
2020	147		−22.2%

As of the 2020 census there were 147 people, 80 households, and 53 families residing in the CDP. The population density was 338.71 inhabitants per square mile (130.78/km^{2}). There were 73 housing units at an average density of 168.20 per square mile (64.94/km^{2}). The racial makeup of the CDP was 99.32% White, 0.68% African American, 0.00% Native American, 0.00% Asian, 0.00% Pacific Islander, 0.00% from other races, and 0.00% from two or more races. Hispanic or Latino of any race were 1.36% of the population.

There were 80 households, out of which 47.5% had children under the age of 18 living with them, 66.25% were married couples living together, 0.00% had a female householder with no husband present, and 33.75% were non-families. 33.75% of all households were made up of individuals, and 2.50% had someone living alone who was 65 years of age or older. The average household size was 3.28 and the average family size was 2.51.

The CDP's age distribution consisted of 33.3% under the age of 18, 0.0% from 18 to 24, 40.4% from 25 to 44, 25.4% from 45 to 64, and 1.0% who were 65 years of age or older. The median age was 35.8 years. For every 100 females, there were 246.6 males. For every 100 females age 18 and over, there were 173.5 males.

The median income for a household in the CDP was $39,583. Males had a median income of $31,250 versus $18,000 for females. The per capita income for the CDP was $19,737. None of the population was below the poverty line.

== Education ==
It is in the Chester-East Lincoln Community Consolidated School District 61 and the Lincoln Community High School District 404.
