= Bernard P. Zeigler =

Canadian electrical engineer (born 1940)

Bernard Phillip Zeigler
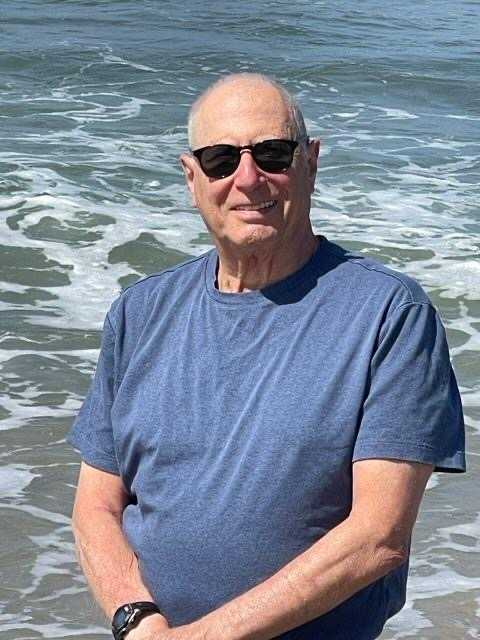
- Bernard P. Zeigler in 2023
- Born: March 5, 1940 (age 86); Montreal, Quebec, Canada

Academic background
- Education: McGill University; MIT; University of Michigan
- Thesis: On the Feedback Complexity of Automata (1969)
- Doctoral advisor: John H. Holland

Academic work
- Institutions: University of Michigan; Weizmann Institute of Science; University of Arizona
- Doctoral students: Andrew Barto

Bernard Phillip Zeigler (born March 5, 1940) is a Canadian-born engineer, and Professor Emeritus of Electrical and Computer Engineering at the University of Arizona. Zeigler is a notable figure in the field of advanced modelling and simulation, known for inventing Discrete Event System Specification (DEVS) in 1976. Zeigler is also Chief Scientist at RTSync, a company with expertise in the commercial applications of DEVS, and specializations in Model-Based System Engineering (MBSE), Predictive Analytics, and Machine Learning technology.

== Background ==
Zeigler was born in Montreal, Quebec and received his Bachelor of Science (BS) in engineering physics in 1962 from McGill University. He went on to receive his Master of Science in Electrical Engineering (M.S.E.E.) in Electrical Engineering from the Massachusetts Institute of Technology (MIT) in 1964, and his PhD in computer and communication science in 1969 from the University of Michigan under the supervision of John H. Holland.

In 1969, Zeigler began his academic career as an associate professor at the University of Michigan, where he held a faculty appointment until 1975 and again from 1980-1981. During this period, he was also a full professor at the Wayne State University in Detroit. From 1975 to 1980 he was faculty member of the Weizmann Institute of Science in Rehovot, Israel. He has since held faculty appointments at Arizona State University (2005-2008), and The University of Arizona (1985-2010) as a Professor Emeritus of Electrical and Computer Engineering.

Since its foundation in 2001, Zeigler has also acted as the Director of the Arizona Center for Integrative Modeling and Simulation (ACIMS). As part of National Defense research, he also holds affiliations with the Center of Excellence in Command, Control, Communications, Computing and Intelligence (C4I Center) at George Mason University. Zeigler is also a founder, Advisory Board member, and the Chief Scientist at RTSync Corp, a company specializing in commercial applications of Zeigler's invention DEVS.

In 1995 Zeigler was awarded IEEE Fellow in recognition of his contributions to the theory of discrete-event simulation, and in 2000 he received the McLeod Founder's Award by the Society for Computer Simulation, also for his contributions to discrete event simulation. He is also a recipient of the SIGSIM Distinguished Contributions Award, a lifetime achievement award that recognizes significant individuals based on their overall contributions to the field of modelling and simulation.

In 2014, Zeigler was interviewed as a pioneering figure for the NC State University Libraries Computer Simulation Archive as part of a special collection of works and oral histories related to the historical advancement of computer simulation. His interview and cataloged works are currently available on this archive. A compendium of Zeigler's papers, reports, and manuscript files is curated and hosted by the NC State University Libraries.

== Publications ==
Books, a selection:

- 1968. On the Feedback Complexity of Automata Ph.D. Thesis. University of Michigan
- 1976. Theory of Modeling and Simulation. Wiley Interscience, New York (1st ed.)
- 1979. Simulation and model-based methodologies: an integrative view. With Tuncer Őren and M.S. Elzas (eds.). Springer-Verlag New York, Inc.
- 1984. Multifacetted Modelling and Discrete Event Simulation. Academic Press, London; Orlando
- 2000. Theory of Modeling and Simulation. 2nd Edition, With Tag Gon Kim and Herbert Praehofer. Academic Press, New York.
- 2017. Guide to Modeling and Simulation of Systems of Systems. With Hessam S. Sarjoughian. Springer Cham.
- 2018. Theory of Modeling and Simulation. 3rd Edition, With Alexandre Muzy and Ernesto Kofman. Academic Press, New York.
- 2020. Value-based Learning Healthcare Systems: Integrative modeling and simulation. With Mamadou Kaba Traore, Gregory Zacharewicz and Raphaël Duboz, IET.
- 2023. Body of Knowledge for Modeling and Simulation. With Tuncer Oren, Andreas Tolk.

Arti Cham, Switzerland.

- . "Hierarchical, modular discrete-event modelling in an object-oriented environment." Simulation. Vol 49 (5). p. 219-230
- 2006. "A Modular Verification Framework using Finite and Deterministic DEVS", with M.H. Hwang in: Proceedings of 2006 DEVS Symposium, pp. 57–65, Huntsville, Alabama, USA,
- 2009. "Reachability Graph of Finite and Deterministic DEVS Networks", with M.H. Hwang in: IEEE Transactions on Automation Science and Engineering, Volume 6, Issue 3, 2009, pp. 454–467
