= Oren (disambiguation) =

Oren is a Hebrew Bible name, meaning pine.

Oren may also refer to:

- Ören, various Turkish places and people with the surname
- Arne Øren (born 1943), Norwegian politician
- Tommy Øren (born 1980), Norwegian retired footballer
- Oren (spy), a British First World War double agent

== See also ==
- Orin (disambiguation)
