= Ören =

Ören may refer to:

== Places ==
=== Turkey ===
- Ören, Acıpayam, a neighbourhood of Acıpayam, a town and a rural district in Denizli Province
- Ören, Bartın, a village in the district of Bartın, Bartın Province
- Ören, Besni, a village in the district of Besni, Adıyaman Province
- Ören, Bilecik, a village in the district of Bilecik, Bilecik Province
- Ören, Boyabat, a village in the district of Boyabat, Sinop Province
- Ören, Cumayeri, a village in the district of Cumayeri, Düzce Province
- Ören, Fethiye, a village in the district of Fethiye, Muğla Province
- Ören, Kuyucak, a village in the district of Kuyucak, Aydın Province
- Ören, Mersin, a town in the district of Anamur, Mersin Province
- Ören, Refahiye, a town in the district of Refahiye, Erzincan Province
- Ören, Silifke, a village in district of Silifke, Mersin Province, Turkey
- Ören, Yeniçağa, a village in the district of Yeniçağa, Bolu Province

=== Elsewhere ===
- Ören Nature Reserve, Nynäshamn Municipality, Stockholm County, Sweden

== People with the surname ==
- Adem Ören (born 1979), Turkish basketball player
- Ahmet Mücahid Ören (born 1972), Turkish businessman
- Ayşe Ören (born 1980), Turkish female designer and sculptor
- Enver Ören (1939–2013), Turkish businessman
- Sinan Ören (born 1987), Turkish footballer
- Tuncer Ören (born 1935), Turkish-Canadian computer scientist

== See also ==
- Oren (disambiguation)
