= Olan =

Olan or OLAN may refer to:

- Olan (mountain), a mountain in the Massif des Écrins in the French Alps (3564 m)
- Olan (dish), a dish that is part of the Kerala cuisine of South India
- Olan Mills Portrait Studios, Olan Studios (photographic)
- Saint Olan (or Olann), patron Saint of the Parish of Aghabullogue in Ireland
- Olan Montgomery (1963–2020), American pop-artist
- Olan Soule (1909–1994), American character actor
- One Letter Aerobatic Notation, OLAN is free software for the design, drawing and viewing of aerobatic sequences; related to the Aresti Catalog Standards document

== See also ==
- Oran (disambiguation)
