= Oren =

Oren (Hebrew: אורן) is a masculine given name, meaning 'pine' or 'ash' in Hebrew. In the Book of Chronicles, Oren is one of the sons of Jerahmeel, the first-born of Hezron, along with Ram, Bunah, Ozem and Ahijah.

Oren may also refer to:

== Given name ==
- Oren Aharoni (born 1973), Israeli basketball coach and former basketball player
- Oren Ambarchi (born 1969), Australian musician
- Oren Biton (born 1994), Israeli football player
- Oren Burks (born 1995), American football player
- Oren Cass (born c. 1983), American policy commentator
- Oren Burbank Cheney (1816–1903), American college president
- Oren P. Coler (1925–1978), justice of the South Dakota Supreme Court
- Oren S. Copeland (1887–1958), American politician
- Oren R. Earl (1813–1901), American politician
- Oren Eizenman (born 1985), Israeli-Canadian ice hockey player
- Oren Frood (1889–1943), Canadian ice hockey player
- Oren Harman (born 1973), Israeli writer
- Oren Harris (1903–1997), American politician and judge
- Oren Koules (born 1961), American businessman
- Oren Lavie (born 1976), Israeli musician and theatre director
- Oren Liebermann (born 1982), American journalist
- Oren E. Long (1889–1965), American politician
- Oren Lyons (born 1930), American artist
- Oren Moverman (born 1966), Israeli filmmaker
- Oren Muharer (born 1971), Israeli football player (retired)
- Oren Nissim (born 1976), Israeli footballer
- Oren Patashnik (born 1954), American computer scientist
- Oren Peli (born 1970), Israeli filmmaker
- Oren Rudavsky (born 1957), American documentary filmmaker
- Oren Safdie (born 1965), Canadian playwright
- Oren Smadja (born 1970), Israeli judoka
- Oren Soffer (1971–2020), Israeli academic
- Oren Soffer (born 1988), Israeli-American cinematographer
- Oren Uziel (born 1974), American film screenwriter, director, and producer
- Oren Wilkes (born 1988), American model
- Oren Williams (born 1992), American actor
- Oren Yiftachel (born 1956), Israeli geographer
- Oren Yoel, American musician and music producer
- Oren Zeitouni (born 1976), Israeli football player

== Surname ==
- Daniel Oren (born 1955), Israeli conductor
- Eric Oren (1868-1937), American businessman and politician
- Jeanette Kuvin Oren (born 1961), American artist
- John Birdsell Oren (1909–2006), American admiral
- Menachem Oren (1903–1962), Israeli chess master and mathematician
- Mordechai Oren (1905–1985), Israeli politician
- Michael Oren (born 1955), Israeli diplomat and historian
- Ram Oren (born 1936), Israeli author
- Rony Oren (born 1953), Israeli animator

== See also ==
- Ören (disambiguation)
- Orin (disambiguation)
- Oranim, plural for "oren"
