= Odhrán =

- Pronunciation: English: /ˈɔːrən/ OR-ən; Irish: [ˈoːɾˠaːnˠ, əuˈɾˠaːnˠ]
- Gender: Masculine

Other gender
- Feminine: Odharnait, Órnait; anglicised as Orna(t)

Origin
- Language: Irish
- Origin: odhar (dun) + -án (diminutive suffix)
- Meaning: Little dun/pale/sallow one Little dark haired one

Other names
- Alternative spelling: Oḋrán
- Anglicisations: Odhran, Or(r)an or Or(r)in
- Related names: Odrán (Old Irish)

Odhrán is an Irish language masculine given name. It is usually anglicised as Odhran (without a fada), Oran or Orin. The feminine equivalent of the name is Odharnait.

== People ==
=== Odhrán ===
- Odhrán Mac Niallais, Gaelic footballer
- Odhran O'Dwyer, Gaelic footballer
- Ódhrán Ua hEolais, 10th century scribe of Clonmacnoise monastery

=== Odrán ===
- Odran (disciple of Saint Patrick), is referred to in Irish Literature as meaning the tall, dark-haired man, friend to St. Patrick.
- O(d)ran of Iona, Irish Christian Saint

== See also ==
- Caoimhín Odhrán Kelleher (born 1998), Irish footballer
- Irish name
- List of Irish given names
- Oran (name)
- Orin
