= Oron =

Oron may refer to:

== Places ==
- France
  - Oron, Moselle, France
- Nigeria
  - Oron, Akwa Ibom, a city and local government area in Akwa Ibom State, Nigeria
  - Oron Nation, one of the major states in the old Calabar Kingdom, Nigeria
- Russia
  - Lake Oron, Bodaybo District, Russia
  - Oron, the largest of the Kapylyushi lakes, Baunt District, Russia
- Switzerland
  - Oron District, Switzerland
  - Oron, Vaud, Switzerland. Created in 2012 it includes the former municipalities of:
    - Oron-la-Ville, Switzerland
    - Oron-le-Châtel, Switzerland

== People with the surname ==
- Haim Oron, Israeli politician
- Amira Oron, Israeli diplomat

== People with the first name ==
- Oron Shagrir, Israeli philosopher

== Others ==
- Oron language, of Nigeria known as Oro
- Oron people, a people from Akwa Ibom State in Nigeria
