= Oran Park =

Oran Park may refer to:

- Oran Park, New South Wales, a suburb of Sydney in Australia
  - Oran Park (homestead), a heritage listed homestead in the suburb of Oran Park
  - Oran Park Raceway, a former motor racing circuit in Sydney, Australia
  - Oran Park Chargers, rugby league team
