= Oren Wilkes =

American fashion model and blogger

Oren Wilkes (born June 6, 1988), is an American fashion model and blogger. Since 2007, Wilkes has been featured in commercials, national advertising campaigns, and editorials for Adidas, Asics, Subaru, Nivea For Men, and more. In 2009, Oren launched Unbiased Writer, a men's lifestyle blog, a part of Glam Media. He is the son of American former professional basketball player James Wilkes (basketball) Oren grew up in Los Angeles, California, and Nagoya, Japan. He graduated from University of Southern California with a bachelor's degree in Public Policy and Development.
