= Tuncer Ören =

Turkish/Canadian computer engineer

Tuncer Ören (born c. 1935) is a Turkish Canadian systems engineer. He is professor emeritus of Computer Science at the School of Electrical Engineering and Computer Science (EECS) of the University of Ottawa and Director of the McLeod Modeling and Simulation Network (M&SNet) of the SCS. He is known for his contributions to the methodology of modelling and simulation.

== Biography ==
Ören was born in c. 1935 in Istanbul, Turkey. He received his MA in Mechanical Engineering at the Istanbul Technical University, and his PhD in Systems Engineering from the University of Arizona, under A. Wayne Wymore.

Őren started his working life in the industry in 1963 as Systems Engineer for IBM Türk in Istanbul, where he coordinated effort in the textile industry, and in education. In 1970, he started his academic career as assistant professor at the Computer Science Department of the University of Ottawa, where in 1981 he became full professor. he has been visiting professor at National Space Activities Commission of Brazil, Sao Jose dos Campos, São Paulo, Brazil in 1971; at the Institute of Systems Sciences, Johannes Kepler University, Linz, Austria in 1983; at the Middle East Technical University, Ankara, Turkey in 1983 and 1991; at the University of Vienna, Austria in 1984–1985; and at the Université Paul Cézanne – Aix Marseille 3, Marseille since 2004.

Őren has been awarded SCS Modeling and Simulation Hall of Fame – Lifetime Achievement Award, and the "Information Age Award" from the Turkish Ministry of Culture.

== Selected publications ==
Ören has published over 475 publications. Books, a selection:

- 1979. Simulation and model-based methodologies: an integrative view. With M.S. Elzas, and B.P Zeigler. Springer-Verlag New York, Inc.
- 2000. Theory of Modeling and Simulation: Integrating Discrete Event and Continuous Complex Systems With H. Praehofer, T.G. Kim. San Diego, CA: John Wiley.

Articles, a selection:

- 1984. "Concepts and criteria to assess acceptability of simulation studies: a frame of reference", in Communications of the ACM 24 (4), 180-189
- 2000. "Concepts for advanced simulation methodologies" With B.P. Zeigler in: Simulation 32 (3), p. 69-82
- 2001. "Advances in Computer and Information Sciences: From Abacus to Holonic Agents." Turk J Elec Engin Vol 9 (1) p. 63–70
- 2006. "Prospective Issues in Simulation Model Composability: Basic Concepts to Advance Theory, Methodology, and Technology", with Levent Yilmaz in: Modeling and Simulation Journal Online
