= Orren Bennett =

Unionist soldier in the American Civil War

- Burial place: Luther's Mills Cemetery
- Military career
- Allegiance: United States of America
- Branch: United States Army
- Service years: 22 August 1862 to 28 May 1865
- Rank: Private
- Unit: 141st Regiment Pennsylvania Volunteer Infantry - Company D
- Conflicts: Battle of Sayler's Creek
- Awards: Medal of Honor

Private Orren Bennett was an American soldier who fought in the American Civil War. Bennett received the country's highest award for bravery during combat, the Medal of Honor, for his action during the Battle of Sayler's Creek in Virginia on 6 April 1865. He was honored with the award on 10 May 1865.

== Biography ==
Bennett was born in Bradford County, Pennsylvania. He enlisted into the 141st Pennsylvania Infantry at Towanda, Pennsylvania. His date of death is unknown.

== Medal of Honor citation ==
Capture of flag.

== See also ==
- List of American Civil War Medal of Honor recipients: A–F
