= Oran Township, Logan County, Illinois =

Coordinates: 40°10′59″N 89°12′20″W

Oran Township
- Township
- Location in Logan County

- Logan County's location in Illinois
- Country: United States
- State: Illinois
- County: Logan
- Established: November 7, 1865

Area
  - Total: 34.29 sq mi (88.8 km^{2})
  - Land: 34.28 sq mi (88.8 km^{2})
  - Water: 0.02 sq mi (0.052 km^{2}) 0.05%

Population (2020)
  - Total: 312
  - Density: 9.10/sq mi (3.51/km^{2})
- Time zone: UTC-6 (CST)
  - Summer (DST): UTC-5 (CDT)
- FIPS code: 17-107-56289

Oran Township is located in Logan County, Illinois. As of the 2020 census, its population was 312 and it contained 149 housing units. The community of Beason is located within the township.

== Geography ==
According to the 2021 census gazetteer files, Oran Township has a total area of 34.29 square miles (88.81 km^{2}), of which 34.28 square miles (88.78 km^{2}) (or 99.95%) is land and 0.02 square miles (0.05 km^{2}) (or 0.05%) is water.

== Demographics ==
As of the 2020 census there were 312 people, 140 households, and 99 families residing in the township. The population density was 9.10 inhabitants per square mile (3.51/km^{2}). There were 149 housing units at an average density of 4.34 per square mile (1.68/km^{2}). The racial makeup of the township was 95.51% White, 0.96% African American, 0.32% Native American, 0.00% Asian, 0.00% Pacific Islander, 0.96% from other races, and 2.24% from two or more races. Hispanic or Latino of any race were 1.92% of the population.

There were 140 households, out of which 33.60% had children under the age of 18 living with them, 67.86% were married couples living together, 2.86% had a female householder with no spouse present, and 29.29% were non-families. 29.30% of all households were made up of individuals, and 11.40% had someone living alone who was 65 years of age or older. The average household size was 2.33 and the average family size was 2.88.

According to the 2020 American Community Survey, township's age distribution consisted of 27.3% under the age of 18, 0.0% from 18 to 24, 26% from 25 to 44, 28.5% from 45 to 64, and 18.1% who were 65 years of age or older. The median age was 43.5 years. For every 100 females, there were 113.7 males. For every 100 females age 18 and over, there were 115.3 males.

The median income for a household in the township was $40,500, and the median income for a family was $46,750. Males had a median income of $31,026 versus $35,962 for females. The per capita income for the township was $21,837. None of the population was below the poverty line.

Historical population
Census	Pop.	Note	%±
2000	452		—
2010	378		−16.4%
2020	312		−17.5%
U.S. Decennial Census
