= Orin (disambiguation) =

Orin is a masculine given name, sometimes spelled Orrin.

Orin or Orinn may also refer to:

== Places ==
=== In the United States ===
- Orrin, North Dakota, an unincorporated community
- Orin, Washington, an unincorporated community
- Orin, Wyoming, a census-designated place

=== Elsewhere ===
- Orin, Pyrénées-Atlantiques, a commune in southwestern France
- Orin, Iran, a village in Tehran Province
- Orin, Nigeria, a town or administrative division in Ekiti State
- River Orrin, a river in Ross, Scotland

== Surname ==
- Deborah Orin (1947–2007), American journalist and Washington D.C. bureau chief for the New York Post
- Max Orrin (born 1994), English professional golfer

== Technology ==
- ORiN (Open Robot/Resource interface for the Network), a standard network interface for factory automation systems
- Tegra Orin, a GPU semiconductor family from Nvidia
- Drive AGX Orin, a GPU board family from Nvidia

== Other uses ==
- Orin (apple), a variety of Japanese apple

== See also ==
- Oak Ridge Institute of Nuclear Studies (ORINS), predecessor of Oak Ridge Associated Universities, a consortium of American universities
- Oren (disambiguation)
