= Oran (name) =

Oran is a masculine given name and a surname. People with the name include:

== Given name ==
- Oran of Iona (died 548), Irish saint
- Oran Wendle Eagleson (1910–1997), American psychologist
- Oran Etkin (born 1979), Israeli musician
- Oran Faville (1817–1872), American politician
- Oran Follett (1798–1894), American politician
- Oran K. Gragson (1911–2002), American politician
- Oran Henderson (1920–1998), American military officer
- Oran B. Hesterman, American agronomist
- Oran Jackson (born 1998), English football player
- Oran "Juice" Jones (born 1957), American singer
- Oran Kearney (born 1978), Northern Irish professional football player and manager
- Oran McPherson (1886–1949), Canadian politician
- Oran Thaddeus Page, known as Hot Lips Page (1908–1954), American jazz musician
- Oran Pape (1904–1936), American football player and police officer
- Oran Milo Roberts (1815–1898), American politician

== Surname ==
- Ahmet Cevdet Oran (1862–1935), Turkish journalist
- Bülent Oran (1924–2004), Turkish screenwriter
- Elaine Oran (born 1944), American scientist
- María Orán (1943–2018), Spanish soprano
- Narcisco Orán (born 1953), Panamanian weightlifter
- Tom Oran (1847–1886), American baseball player
- Umut Oran (born 1962), Turkish politician
