= List of systems engineering universities =

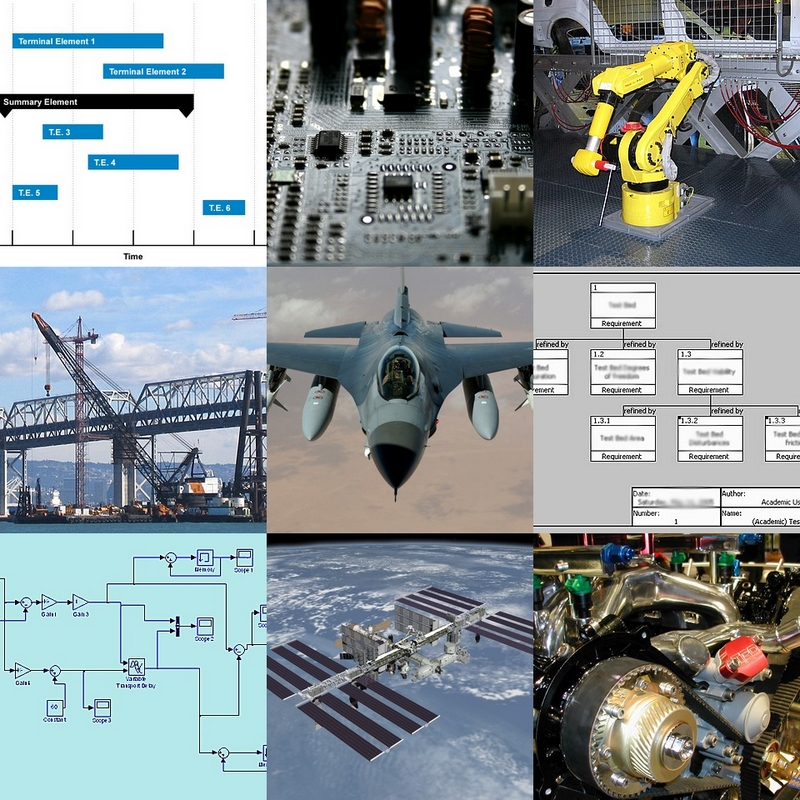
Systems engineering is an interdisciplinary field of engineering, that focuses on the development and organization of complex systems.

This list of systems engineering at universities gives an overview of the different forms of systems engineering (SE) programs, faculties, and institutes at universities worldwide. Since there is no clear consensus on what constitutes a systems engineering degree, this list simply identifies the college and department offering degrees and the degrees offered.

Education in systems engineering is often observed to be an extension to the regular engineering courses, reflecting the industry attitude that engineering professionals need a foundational background in one of the traditional engineering disciplines (e.g. civil engineering, electrical engineering, industrial engineering) plus professional, real-world experience to be effective as systems engineers. Undergraduate university programs in systems engineering are rare.

Education in systems engineering can be viewed as systems-centric or domain-centric.

- Systems-centric programs treat systems engineering as a separate discipline with most courses focusing on systems engineering theory and practice.
- Domain-centric programs offer systems engineering topics as an option that can be embedded within the major domains or fields of engineering.

Both categories strive to educate the systems engineer with capability to oversee interdisciplinary projects with the depth required of a core-engineer.

The International Council on Systems Engineering (INCOSE) maintained a continuously updated Directory of Systems Engineering Academic Programs worldwide, which is now maintained in collaboration with the Systems Engineering Research Center (SERC) in a standalone site named "Worldwide Directory of Systems Engineering and Industrial Engineering Programs" or WWDSIE

== Systems engineering degrees in Europe ==
Location	University	School/Department	Degrees Offered
Finland	Helsinki University of Technology		Process Systems Engineering
France, Italy	University of Technology of Compiègne, University of Genoa		European Master in Engineering for Complex and Interacting Systems
France, Marseille	Polytech Marseille		Industrial Engineering, Computer science
France, Lille	École centrale de Lille		Systems engineering, industrial engineering
France, Lyon	École centrale de Lyon		Systems engineering, industrial engineering
France, Nantes	École centrale de Nantes		Systems engineering, industrial engineering
France, Angers	Université d'Angers	École polytechnique de l'université d'Angers	Systems engineering, industrial engineering
France, Paris	École centrale Paris		Systems engineering, industrial engineering
France, Paris	École supérieure d'électricité		Systems engineering, industrial engineering
France, Paris	École Polytechnique		Systems engineering
France, Metz	École nationale supérieure d'arts et métiers		Systems engineering
France, Toulouse	École nationale de l'aviation civile		M.Sc in International Air Transport System Engineering and Design (IATSED)
France, Toulouse	École nationale supérieure de l'aéronautique et de l'espace		Systems engineering management
France, Toulouse	Institut National des Sciences Appliquées de Toulouse		Systems engineering
France, Toulouse	Institut National Polytechnique de Toulouse		Process systems engineering, industrial systems engineering
France, Nancy	Nancy-Université	Faculté des Sciences et Techniques	MSc in complex systems engineering (CSE)
Germany, Aachen	RWTH Aachen University		Automotive systems engineering; Electrical Engineering and Information Technology with Systems Engineering as a master field of study
Germany, Bremen	Universität Bremen		Systems engineering, BSc, MSc
Germany, Hamburg	Technische Universität Hamburg-Harburg		Aircraft systems engineering, BSc, MSc
Germany, Karlsruhe	Karlsruhe Institute of Technology	Hector School of Engineering and Management	Executive M.Sc. in Embedded Systems Engineering
Germany, Magdeburg	Otto von Guericke University Magdeburg	M.Sc. in Systems Engineering for Manufacturing	
Germany, Munich	University of the Bundeswehr Munich	M.Sc. in Systems Engineering	
Germany, Munich	Munich University of Applied Sciences		Master of systems engineering
Germany, Paderborn	University of Paderborn		
Germany, Saarbrücken	Saarland University		Systems Engineering, B.Sc., M.Sc.
Greece, Samos	University of the Aegean		Information systems engineering
Greece, Syros	University of the Aegean		Product and Systems Design Engineering
Italy, Rome	University of Rome "Tor Vergata"		Postgraduate master's degree in Systems Engineering
Netherlands, Arnhem	HAN University of Applied Sciences	School of Engineering and Automotive	Bachelor Embedded Systems Engineering, Master Automotive Systems, Master Cyber-Physical Systems, Master Sustainable Energy
Netherlands, Delft	Dutch Institute of Systems and Control		PhD in systems and control theory and engineering
Netherlands, Delft	TU Delft SpaceTech		Space systems engineering
Netherlands, Delft	Delft University of Technology		Systems engineering, policy analysis and management
Northern Cyprus	Eastern Mediterranean University		Information systems engineering
Northern Cyprus	Cyprus International University		Information systems engineering
Norway, Trondheim	Norwegian University of Science and Technology	Department of Engineering Cybernetics	
Norway	University of South-Eastern Norway, formerly Buskerud University College	Faculty of Technology	Systems Engineering, Systems Engineering with Embedded Systems
Poland, Wrocław	Wrocław University of Science and Technology	Faculty of Information and Communication Technology	Systems engineering
Portugal, Lisbon	Instituto Superior de Agronomia		Biological systems engineering
Portugal, Porto	Instituto Politécnico do Porto	Instituto Superior de Engenharia	Systems Engineering
Romania, Bucharest	Polytechnic University of Bucharest	The Faculty of Automatic Control and Computer Science	Systems Engineering
Romania, Timișoara	Polytechnic University of Timișoara	Systems Engineering department	Systems Engineering
Russia, Saint Petersburg	Saint Petersburg State University of Information Technologies, Mechanics and Optics		Systems engineering
Sweden	Blekinge Institute of Technology		Software engineering – MSc and PhD
Sweden	Chalmers University of Technology		Systems Control and Mechatronics - MSc
Sweden	KTH Royal Institute of Technology		Systems Control and Robotics - MSc
Sweden	Lund University		Machine Learning, Systems and Control - MSc
Sweden, Kronobergs län	Växjö University	Systems engineering	
Switzerland, Buchs, St. Gallen, St. Gallen	NTB Interstate University of Applied Sciences of Technology		Systems engineering NTB
Switzerland, Chur	University of Applied Sciences HTW Chur		Systems engineering NTB
Turkey, Ankara	Atılım University		Information systems engineering
Turkey, İzmir	İzmir University of Economics		Industrial systems engineering
Turkey, Istanbul	Sabancı University		Manufacturing systems engineering
Turkey, Istanbul	Turkish Naval Academy		Systems engineering
Turkey, Ankara	Turkish Military Academy		Systems engineering
Turkey, Istanbul	Yeditepe University		Systems engineering
Turkey, Istanbul	Boğaziçi University		MSc systems and control engineering
United Kingdom, Birmingham	University of Birmingham	Centre for Railway Research and Education	MSc in railway systems engineering
United Kingdom, Bristol	University of Bristol	Systems Centre	Systems
United Kingdom, Bedfordshire	Cranfield University	Schools: Cranfield Defence and Security; School of Aerospace, Transport and Manufacturing	Systems Engineering for Defence Capability MSc , Military Electronic Systems Engineering MSc, Engineering & Management of Manufacturing Systems, Management & Information Systems, Process Systems engineering, MSc.Astronautics and Space Engineering
United Kingdom	University of Essex		Electronic systems engineering
United Kingdom, Glasgow	University of Glasgow		Space systems engineering
United Kingdom, Glasgow	University of Strathclyde		Space systems engineering
United Kingdom, Leicester	University of Leicester	Department of Physics & Astronomy (Space Research Centre)	Space Exploration Systems MSc
United Kingdom, London	Imperial College London	Department of Electrical and Electronic Engineering	Control and Power M.Sc.and Ph.D.
United Kingdom, London	University College London	Department of Space and Climate Physics (Mullard Space Science Laboratory)	Systems engineering management
United Kingdom, Manchester	University of Manchester	School of Electrical and Electronic Engineering	Control Systems M.Sc., Ph.D.
United Kingdom, Newcastle	Newcastle University		Earth Systems Engineering (coupled human-natural-engineered systems analysis); Mechanical and systems engineering
United Kingdom, Sheffield	University of Sheffield	Department of Automatic Control and Systems Engineering	Systems and control engineering, computer systems engineering, mechatronic and robotic engineering, mphil and phd systems engineering research degrees
United Kingdom, Southampton	University of Southampton		Space systems engineering
United Kingdom, Kent	University of Kent	School of Engineering and Digital Arts	CompuTER SYSTEMS ENgineering
United Kingdom, Warwick	University of Warwick	School of Engineering	Systems Engineering BEng., MEng.
Ukraine, Kharkiv	University of Kharkiv	School of Computer Science	System engineering
Ukraine, Kyiv	Kyiv Polytechnic Institute	Informatics and Computer Engineering	System engineering
Ukraine, Kyiv	National Aviation University	Institute of Airspace Control Systems	System engineering

== Systems engineering degrees in the United States ==
As of 2009, some 76 institutions in United States offer 131 undergraduate and graduate programs in systems engineering.

University	College	Department	Degrees Offered
Alabama A&M University	College of Engineering, Technology and Physical Sciences	Systems and Materiel Engineering	Systems and Materiel Engineering, MEng
Air Force Institute of Technology	Graduate School of Engineering and Management	Systems and Engineering Management	Systems engineering, MS and PhD
Auburn University	Engineering	Industrial and Systems Engineering	Industrial and systems engineering, BS, MISE, MS, and PhD
Arizona State University	Ira A. Fulton School of Engineering	Department	Computer Systems Engineering
Binghamton University (State University of New York)	Watson College of Engineering & Applied Science	Systems Science & Industrial Engineering	Industrial & Systems Engineering, BS, MS, MS (Health Systems track), PhD; Systems Engineering, MS, MS Healthcare; Executive MS in Health Systems Science (SUNY- Global Center Manhattan); MPA/MS in Systems Science; Systems Science, MS, PhD
Boston University	Boston University College of Engineering	Systems Engineering	Systems Engineering, MS, MEng, & PhD; Computer systems engineering, MS, MEng, & PhD
Cal Poly, San Luis Obispo			Space Systems Engineering
Cal State Fullerton	College of Engineering and Computer Science	Electrical Engineering	MS in Systems Engineering
Case Western Reserve University	Case School of Engineering	Electrical Engineering and Computer Science	Systems and Control Engineering, BS, MS, PhD
Colorado State University	Walter Scott, Jr. College of Engineering	Systems Engineering	MS, ME, PhD & D.Eng in Systems Engineering
Cornell University	Cornell University College of Engineering	Systems Engineering Program	Systems engineering, MEng; Systems, PhD
Drexel University	College of Engineering	Systems Engineering Program	MS in Systems Engineering
Duke University	Pratt School of Engineering	Institute for Enterprise Engineering	Master of Engineering in Systems Engineering
Embry-Riddle Aeronautical University	College of Engineering	Electrical, Computer, Software and Systems Engineering	Electrical engineering, BS, aerospace system track Systems engineering, MS
Florida Institute of Technology	College of Engineering	Engineering Systems	Systems engineering, MS and industrial and systems engineering, BS, MS, and PhD
University of New Haven	Talaglieta College of Engineering	Engineering Systems	Systems engineering, MS and industrial and systems engineering, BS, MS,
Georgia Institute of Technology	Georgia Tech's College of Engineering	Professional master's degree in Applied Systems Engineering (PMASE)	Applied Systems Engineering, MS and PhD
George Mason University	School of Engineering	Systems Engineering and Operations Research	Systems engineering, BS and MS; Systems engineering and operations research, PhD
George Washington University	Engineering and Applied Science	Engineering Management and Systems Engineering Department	Systems engineering, BS and MS; Systems engineering, PhD
Iowa State University	College of Engineering	Systems Engineering Program	Systems engineering, MEng
Johns Hopkins University	Engineering	Graduate degree programs	Systems engineering, MS, M.Eng; Civil and Systems Engineering, PhD
Kennesaw State University	Engineering	Graduate Degree Program	Master of Science (MS) in Systems Engineering Doctor of Philosophy (PhD) in Interdisciplinary Engineering
Loyola Marymount University	College of Science and Engineering	Graduate Degree Programs	Systems engineering and leadership, MS
Maine Maritime Academy			Marine Systems Engineering,
Massachusetts Institute of Technology	MIT School of Engineering & MIT Sloan School of Management	System Design & Management	MS in Engineering and Management
Michigan State University	MSU College of Engineering	Biosystems and Agricultural Engineering	Biosystems Engineering
Michigan Technological University	College of Engineering	Engineering Fundamentals	Engineering with Systems Engineering Concentration, BS
Missouri University of Science and Technology		Engineering Management and Systems Engineering	Systems engineering, MS and PhD
Morehead State University	College of Science	Earth and Space Sciences	Space Systems Engineering (B.S, M.S)
National University	School of Engineering and Technology	Applied Engineering	Engineering Management with Specialization in Systems Engineering, MS
Naval Postgraduate School	Engineering and Applied Sciences Graduate School (GSEAS)	Systems Engineering Department	Systems engineering, MS and PhD
North Carolina State University	Engineering	Department	Industrial and systems engineering
Northwestern Polytechnic University	School	Department	Computer Systems Engineering
Oakland University	Engineering and Science	Industrial and Systems Engineering Department	Industrial and Systems Engineering, MS, Systems Engineering, MS and PhD
Old Dominion University	Frank Batten College of Engineering & Technology	Department of Engineering Management and Systems Engineering	Systems Engineering MS and PhD
Oklahoma State University	College of Engineering, Architecture, and Technology	School of Industrial Engineering and Management	Industrial Engineering and Management MS and PhD, Master of Industrial Engineering and Management
Oregon Institute of Technology	School	Department	Computer Systems Engineering
Portland State University	Engineering and Computer Science	Systems Engineering	Systems engineering, MS
Portland State University	Systems Science Graduate Program	Systems Science	Systems science, MS and PhD
Purdue University	Engineering	Chemical Engineering	Systems engineering, PhD
Regis University	College of Computer & Information Sciences	Information Systems	MS in Enterprise Systems Engineering
Rensselaer Polytechnic Institute	School	Department	Computer systems engineering
Rochester Institute of Technology	Engineering	Department	Industrial and Systems Engineering
Rutgers University	School of Engineering	Industrial and Systems Engineering	BS, MS and PhD degrees in industrial and Systems Engineering
San José State University	Charles W. Davidson College of Engineering	Interdisciplinary Engineering	Interdisciplinary Engineering, BS
Southern Methodist University	Engineering	Engineering Management, Information, and Systems Department	Systems Engineering, MS and PhD, and Executive MS
Southern Polytechnic State University	School of Engineering	Systems Engineering	Systems Engineering, BS and MS
Stevens Institute of Technology	School of Systems and Enterprises	School of Systems and Enterprises	Systems Engineering, MEngr and PhD
Tennessee State University			Information systems engineering,
Texas A&M University	Engineering	Industrial and Systems Engineering Department (with Mays School of Management)	Industrial and Systems Engineering, BS and Systems Engineering, ME and MS
Texas A&M	Texas A&M College of Agriculture and Life Sciences	Biological & Agricultural Engineering	Biological Systems Engineering,
Texas Tech University	Texas Tech University College of Engineering	Department of Industrial Engineering	Systems and Engineering Management, MS and PhD
The Pennsylvania State University	Graduate Professional Studies	Engineering Division	Systems Engineering, Master of Engineering
UC Berkeley	UC Berkeley College of Engineering		Power Systems Engineering,
UIUC	College of Engineering	Industrial and Enterprise Systems Engineering	Systems and Entrepreneurial Engineering MS, PhD
UNC Charlotte	The William States Lee College of Engineering	Systems Engineering and Engineering Management	Systems engineering BS, engineering management MS, infrastructure and environmental systems PhD
United States Air Force Academy	Engineering Division	Systems Engineering program	Systems engineering, BS
United States Military Academy		Systems Engineering	BS - Systems Engineering, Engineering Management, Systems and Decision Sciences
United States Naval Academy	Engineering and Weapons Division	Weapons, Robotics, and Control Engineering	Robotics and Control engineering, BS
University at Buffalo	School of Engineering & Applied Sciences	Industrial & Systems Engineering	
University of Alabama in Huntsville	College of Engineering	Industrial & Systems Engineering and Engineering Management	BS degree in Industrial & Systems Engineering and MS and PhD degrees in Industrial Engineering, Systems Engineering, and Engineering Management
University of Arizona	College of Engineering	Department of Systems & Industrial Engineering	Systems engineering, industrial engineering, engineering management
University of Arkansas at Little Rock	Engineering and Information Technology	Systems Engineering	Systems Engineering, BS, MS, PhD
University of Florida	College of Engineering	Industrial and Systems Engineering	Industrial and Systems Engineering, MS
University of Louisiana at Lafayette	College of Engineering		Systems Engineering, PhD
University of Maryland, College Park	A. James Clark School of Engineering	Institute for Systems Research	Systems engineering. MS
University of Maryland, Baltimore County	Continuing & Professional Studies	UMBC Professional Studies	Systems engineering. MS and graduate certificate
University of Massachusetts Amherst	School	Department	Computer Systems Engineering
University of Michigan - Ann Arbor	College of Engineering	Integrative Systems + Design	Master of Engineering
University of Michigan - Ann Arbor	Interdisciplinary	The Center for the Study of Complex Systems (CSCS)	College of Literature, Science and the Arts (LSA)
University of Nebraska–Lincoln	School	Department	Biological systems engineering
University of Pennsylvania	Engineering and Applied Science (supplemented by schools of Business and Arts & Sciences)		Systems Engineering, MS and Systems Science and Engineering, BSE
University of Rhode Island	College of Engineering	Department of Mechanical, Industrial and Systems Engineering	B.Sc. in Industrial and Systems Engineering, M.Sc. in Systems Engineering, Ph.D. in Industrial and Systems Engineering
University of South Alabama	College of Engineering	Systems Engineering Program	Master of Science, PhD
University of Southern California	Viterbi School of Engineering	Daniel J. Epstein Department of Industrial and Systems Engineering	M.S. in Industrial and Systems Engineering, M.S. in Industrial and Systems Engineering/MBA, M.S. in Systems Architecting and Engineering, M.S. in Health Systems Management Engineering, M.S. in Engineering Management
University of San Diego	Shiley-Marcos School of Engineering	Department of Industrial & Systems Engineering	BS/BA Dual Degree in Industrial & Systems Engineering
University of St. Thomas (Minnesota)	School of Engineering	Department of Systems Engineering	MS Systems Engineering
University of Texas at Arlington	College of Engineering	Department of Industrial & Manufacturing Systems Engineering	Systems Engineering, MS
University of Texas at Dallas	School of Management & Erik Jonsson School of Engineering and Computer Science		Systems Engineering & Management, MS
University of Texas at El Paso	College of Engineering	Industrial Manufacturing and Systems Engineering	MS in Systems Engineering (MSSE), MS in Industrial Engineering (MSIE), MS in Manufacturing Engineering (MSMFG), Graduate Certificate in Systems Engineering (GCSE), Industrial & Systems Engineering (ISE) PhD concentration within ECE
University of Virginia	Engineering and Applied Science	Systems & Information Engineering	Systems Engineering, BS, MS, MEng and PhD
University of Wisconsin–Madison	College of Engineering	Industrial and Systems Engineering	BS Biological Systems Engineering, MS Manufacturing Systems Engineering,
Vanderbilt University	Engineering	Engineering Management Program	Systems Engineering
Virginia Polytechnic Institute and State University	College of Engineering	Industrial and Systems Engineering	Industrial and Systems Engineering (BS, MS, PhD)
Washington State University	School	Department	Biological systems engineering
Washington University in St. Louis	School of Engineering and Applied Science	Dept. of Electrical & Systems Engineering	Systems Engineering (BS, MS, PhD)
West Virginia University	College of Engineering and Mineral Resources	Dept. of Industrial and Management Systems Engineering	Industrial Engineering (BS, MS, PhD)
Fairfield University	School of Engineering	School of Engineering Graduate Program,	Management of Technology (MS)
Worcester Polytechnic Institute	Science and Engineering Program	Corporate and Professional Education	MS In Systems Engineering Graduate Certificate in Systems Engineering Graduate Certificate in Program Protection Planning
Polytechnic Institute of New York University	Science and Engineering Program	Electrical and Computer Engineering	Systems Engineering (MS)
Youngstown State University	School	Department	Industrial and Systems Engineering, MS

== Systems Engineering degrees in other countries ==
Location	University	College/Department	Degrees Offered
Argentina	Universidad Abierta Interamericana	Department of IT	Engineer's degree in Systems Engineering
Argentina	National Defense University (UNDEF)	Córdoba IUA Regional University Center, an organization of the Argentine Air Force, belonging to the National Defense University	Engineer's degree in Systems Engineering
Argentina	National University of Central Buenos Aires	Department of Computer and Systems	Engineer's degree in Systems Engineering
Argentina	National Technological University	Department of Information Systems Engineering	Engineer's degree in Information Systems Engineering
Australia	RAAF Base Edinburgh		Space Systems Engineering
Australia, Adelaide	University of South Australia	STEM	Master of Systems Engineering, Graduate Diploma in Systems Engineering
Australia, Brisbane	University of Queensland		Systems Engineering
Australia, Canberra	Australian National University	ANU College of Engineering and Computer Science	Bachelor of Engineering (Honours), with a major-equivalent requirement in systems engineering
Australia, Canberra	University of New South Wales	UNSW Canberra at ADFA	Master of Engineering (Systems Engineering)
Australia, Melbourne	RMIT		Master of Engineering (Systems Engineering)
Australia, Sydney	UTS		Master of Engineering Studies(Systems Engineering)
Australia, Victoria	Monash University		Computer Systems Engineering
Azerbaijan, Baku	Azerbaijan State University of Economics	Faculty of Digital Economy	Systems Engineering
Bolivia	UPB - Universidad Privada Boliviana	Faculty of Engineering and Architecture	Industrial and Systems Engineering
Bolivia	UCB - Universidad Catolica Boliviana	Faculty of Engineering	Systems Engineering
Brazil, Belo Horizonte	Universidade Federal de Minas Gerais - UFMG	Engineering School (Escola de Engenharia da UFMG)	Bachelor of Systems Engineering (BSc)
Brazil, Montes Claros	Universidade Estadual de Montes Claros - Unimontes	Departamento de Ciência da Computação - DCC	Bachelor of Systems Engineering (BSc)
Brazil, Rio de Janeiro	IME - Instituto Militar de Engenharia		Computer Systems Engineering
Canada, Montreal	Concordia University	Concordia Institute for Information Systems Engineering	Quality Systems Engineering, M.Eng
Canada, Montreal	Concordia University	Faculty of Engineering and Computer Science	Industrial Engineering
Canada, Regina	University of Regina		Electronic Systems Engineering, Environmental Systems Engineering, Industrial Systems Engineering, Petroleum Systems Engineering, Software Systems Engineering
Canada, Burnaby	Simon Fraser University		Systems Engineering
Canada, Vancouver	University of British Columbia		Integrated Engineering
Canada, Guelph	University of Guelph	School of Engineering	Engineering Systems and Computing
Canada, London	University of Western Ontario	Faculty of Engineering	Integrated (Systems) Engineering
Canada, Waterloo	University of Waterloo	Faculty of Engineering	Systems Design Engineering
Canada, Halifax	Dalhousie University	Faculty of Engineering	Industrial Engineering
Canada, Toronto	University of Toronto	Faculty of Applied Science and Engineering	Industrial (Systems) Engineering
China, Hong Kong	Hong Kong Polytechnic University		Industrial and Systems Engineering
China	Beijing University of Aeronautics and Astronautics		Process Systems Engineering
China	Tsinghua University	Department of Industrial Engineering	Industrial Engineering
Colombia, Barranquilla	Universidad del Norte	Faculty of Engineering	Systems Engineering
Colombia, Bogotá	Escuela Colombiana de Ingeniería		Systems Engineering
Colombia, Bogotá	Institución Universitaria Politécnico Grancolombiano	Faculty of Engineering	Systems Engineering
Colombia, Bogotá	Pontificia Universidad Javeriana		Systems Engineering
Colombia, Bogotá	Universidad Autonoma de Colombia	Faculty of Engineering	Systems Engineering
Colombia, Bogotá	Universidad Católica de Colombia	Faculty of Engineering	Systems Engineering
Colombia, Bogotá	Universidad de los Andes	Faculty of Engineering	Systems and Computing Engineering
Colombia, Bogotá	Universidad Distrital Francisco José de Caldas	Faculty of Engineering	Systems Engineering
Colombia, Bogotá	Universidad INCCA de colombia	Faculty of Engineering	Systems Engineering
Colombia, Bogotá	Universidad Nacional de Colombia	Faculty of Engineering	Systems and Engineering
Colombia, Bogotá	Universidad Sergio Arboleda	Faculty of Engineering	Systems and Telecommunications Engineering
Colombia, Manizales	Universidad de Caldas	Faculty of Engineering	Systems and Computing Engineering
Colombia, Medellín	EAFIT University	Faculty of Engineering	Systems Engineering
Colombia, Tunja	Universidad Pedagógica y Tecnológica de Colombia	Faculty of Engineering	Systems and Computing Engineering
Santo Domingo, Dominican Republic	Instituto Tecnologico de Santo Domingo	Engineering	Systems Engineering
Honduras	Universidad José Cecilio del Valle		Computer Systems Engineering
Honduras	Universidad Tecnologica Centroamericana - UNITEC		Industrial and Systems Engineering
India, Bangalore, Karnataka	Indian Institute of Science (IISC)	Jointly offered by Department of Electrical Engineering and Department of Computer Science and Automation	Systems Science and Automation
India, Kharagpur, West Bengal	Indian Institute of Technology Kharagpur (IIT KGP)	Department of Industrial and Systems Engineering	B.Tech in Industrial Engineering, M.Tech. in Industrial Engineering, MS, Phd
India, Chennai, Tamil Nadu	SRM Institute of Science and Technology	Engineering	
India, Varanasi, Uttar Pradesh	Institute of Technology, Banaras Hindu University	Electrical Engineering	
India, Aligarh, Uttar Pradesh	Zakir Husain College of Engg. & Technology (Aligarh Muslim University)	Department of Electrical Engg.	M.S; Phd Instrumentation and Control
Maangalayatan University (MU)	Engineering & Technology		
India, Jodhpur, Rajasthan	Indian Institute of Technology Rajasthan	Dept. of Systems Science	BTech Systems Science Engineering, PhD Systems Science
India, Jodhpur, Rajasthan	Indian Institute of Technology Rajasthan	Dept. of Electrical Engineering	Power Systems Engineering
India, Agra, U.P.	Dayalbagh Educational Institute	Dept. of Electrical Engineering	Engineering Systems
India, Warangal	National Institute of Technology, Warangal		Manufacturing Systems Engineering
India, Warangal	National Institute of Technology, Warangal		Process Control, M.Tech., PhD
India, Kolkata		*Aliah University, Kolkata, West Bengal	
India, Mumbai	Indian Institute of Technology, Bombay	Systems and Control Engineering Department	Systems Design and Engineering, M.Tech., PhD
India	Indian Institute of Technology, Delhi	Control and Automation, Electrical Engineering Department	M.Tech, PhD
India	K.L.N College Of Engineering		
Indonesia	Universitas Gadjah Mada	Faculty of Engineering	M.Sc. in Systems Engineering
Israel	Technion – Israel Institute of Technology		Systems Engineering
Israel	Afeka College of Engineering		Systems Engineering, M.Sc.
Iraq, Baghdad	University of Technology, Iraq		Control and computer Systems Engineering Dept.
Iran, Tehran	Sharif University of Technology		Systems Engineering, M.Sc.
Iran, Tehran	Tarbiat Modares University		Faculty of Engineering, Information Technology Systems Engineering M.Sc.
Iran, Tehran	K. N. Toosi University of Technology	Faculty of Electrical Engineering, Department of Control & System Engineering	Control & System Engineering (BSc., MSc., Ph.D.)
Iran, Mazandaran, Babol	Babol noshirvani university of technology		Industrial engineering(BSc., MSc.)
Iran, Tehran	Azad University - South Tehran		Industrial & System Engineering, M.Sc.
Japan, Fukuoka Prefecture	Kyushu Institute of Technology		Computer Science and Systems Engineering
Japan, Toyota, Aichi,	Toyota National College of Technology		Electronic Systems Engineering
Japan, Wakayama	Wakayama University		Systems Engineering
Japan, Shizuoka	Shizuoka University		Systems Engineering
Japan	Osaka University		Information Systems Engineering
Japan	Keio University	Graduate School of System Design and Management	System Design and Management (M.S., Ph.D.), System Engineering (M.S., Ph.D.)
Jordan	German-Jordanian University		Systems Engineering
Malaysia, Kuala Lumpur	Tunku Abdul Rahman University of Management & Technology	Faculty of Applied Sciences and Computing (FASC)	Software Systems Development, Enterprise Information Systems
Malaysia, Perlis	Universiti Malaysia Perlis		Electronic Systems Engineering
Malaysia, Perak	Petronas University of Technology		Power Systems Engineering
Malaysia, Perak	Universiti Tunku Abdul Rahman	Faculty of Engineering and Green Technology (FEGT), Faculty of Information and Communication Technology (FICT)	Industrial Engineering, Business Information Systems, Information Systems Engineering
Mexico, Mexico City	Universidad Nacional Autónoma de México		Systems Engineering
Mexico, Mexico City	Instituto Politécnico Nacional		Systems Engineering
Mexico, Monterrey, N.L.	Universidad Autónoma de Nuevo León		Systems Engineering
Mexico, Mexico City	Instituto Tecnológico y de Estudios Superiores de Monterrey		Industrial and Systems Engineering
Mexico, Aguascalientes	Universidad Autónoma de Aguascalientes		Computer Systems Engineering
Morocco, Rabat	École Nationale Supérieure des Mines de Rabat	Computer Science	Production Systems Engineering
Nigeria, Lagos	University of Lagos		Systems Engineering
Pakistan, Islamabad	National University of Science & Technology	Research Center for Modeling & Simulation	MS-Systems Engineering
Panamá, Panamá	Universidad Tecnológica de Panamá	Faculty of Computer Systems Engineering	Computer Systems Engineering
Peru, Arequipa	Catholic University of Santa María	Faculty of Science and Engineering	Systems Engineering
Peru, Huancayo	Universidad Nacional del Centro del Peru	Faculty of Systems Engineering	Systems Engineering
Peru, Huancayo	Los Andes Peruvian University		Computer Science and Systems Engineering
Peru, Lima City	National University of San Marcos		Systems Engineering
Peru, Lima City	National University Federico Villareal		Faculty of Industrial and Systems Engineering
Peru, Lima	National University of Engineering	Faculty of Industrial and Systems Engineering	Industrial and Systems Engineering
Peru, Lima - Callao	National University of Callao	Faculty of Industrial and Systems Engineering	Industrial and Systems Engineering
Peru, Lima	Universidad de Lima	Faculty of Systems Engineering	Systems Engineering
Peru, Lima	Universidad Científica del Sur		Systems Engineering Management
Philippines, Manila	De La Salle University-Manila College of Computer Studies		Computer Systems Engineering
Saudi Arabia, Dhahran	King Fahd University of Petroleum and Minerals		Systems Engineering (MSc, PhD), Control and Instrumentation Systems Engineering (BS), Industrial & Systems Engineering (BS)
Singapore	National University of Singapore	Department of Industrial and Systems Engineering	BEng(Industrial and Systems Engineering), Executive Master (Systems Engineering and Management), MSc(Industrial and Systems Engineering), MEng and PhD degrees by research in Systems Engineering
Singapore	Singapore Institute of Technology	Engineering	Bachelor of Engineering in Robotics Systems
Singapore	Nanyang Technological University		Systems Engineering and Project Management
Singapore	Singapore University of Technology and Design		Engineering Systems and Design
Singapore	Singapore Institute of Management University	School of Science and Technology	Aerospace system Engineering
South Africa, Johannesburg	University of Witwatersrand	School of Mechanical, Industrial and Aeronautical Engineering	Industrial and Systems Engineering
South Africa, Pretoria	University of Pretoria	Department of Industrial and Systems Engineering	Industrial and Systems Engineering
South Africa, Stellenbosch	University of Stellenbosch	Department of Industrial Engineering	Industrial Engineering
South Korea, Suwon	Ajou University	Department of Systems Engineering	Master of Systems Engineering, Ph.D. of Systems Engineering
South Korea, Daejeon	KAIST	Department of Industrial & Systems Engineering	BS, MS, Ph.D., of Industrial & Systems Engineering
South Korea, Seoul	Korea University	Department of Industrial and Management Engineering	MS, Ph.D. of Industrial and Management Engineering
South Korea, Incheon	Inha University	SCGS	Integrated Systems Engineering
Sri Lanka, Colombo	University of Colombo	School of Computing	Information Systems Engineering
Sri Lanka, Malabe	Sri Lanka Institute of Information Technology	Department of Computer Systems & Networking	Computer Systems Engineering
Syria	Syrian Virtual University		Information Systems Engineering
Thailand, Bangkok	Chulalongkorn University	Electrical engineering(Control Systems Research Laboratory:CSRL) Mechanical engineering department	Electrical engineering Mechanical engineering
Thailand, Bangkok	King Mongkut's Institute of Technology Ladkrabang		Industrial and Systems Engineering
Thailand, Chonburi	Asian University		Information Systems Engineering
United Arab Emirates, Dubai	The British University in Dubai	Faculty of Engineering and Information Technology	MSc in Systems Engineering
Venezuela, Anzoátegui	Universidad de Oriente	Department of Computation and Systems	Systems Engineering
Venezuela, Anzoategui	Universidad Santa María		Systems Engineering
Venezuela, Aragua	Universidad Bicentenaria de Aragua	Faculty of Engineering	Systems Engineering
Venezuela, Caracas	Universidad Metropolitana		Systems Engineering
Venezuela, Caracas	Universidad Santa María	Faculty of Engineering and Architecture	Systems Engineering
Venezuela, Caracas	UNEFA, antiguo IUPFAN		Systems Engineering
Venezuela, Caracas	Universidad Nacional Abierta		Systems Engineering
Venezuela, Caracas	Universidad Nacional Experimental Politécnica Antonio José de Sucre		Systems Engineering
Venezuela, Maturín	Instituto Universitario Politécnico "Santiago Mariño"	School of Engineering	Systems Engineering
Venezuela, Maturín	Universidad de Oriente	School of Engineering and Applied Sciences	Systems Engineering
Venezuela, Mérida	Universidad de Los Andes	Faculty of Engineering, School of Systems Engineering	Computer Systems Engineering, Control and Automation Systems Engineering, Operations Research Systems Engineering
Vietnam	Ho Chi Minh City University of Technology		Industrial and Systems Engineering
Hong Kong	City University of Hong Kong	Department of Mechanical and Biomedical Engineering	Manufacturing Systems Engineering

== Research institutes for systems engineering ==
In Asia:

- Research Center for Modeling & Simulation, National University of Science and Technology, Islamabad, Pakistan.

In Europe:

- Hasso Plattner Institute related to the University of Potsdam, Germany.
- Informatics Research Centre at the University of Reading Business School, Reading, Berkshire, England, UK.
- I2S - Institut d'ingénierie des systèmes at the École Polytechnique Fédérale de Lausanne in Lausanne, Switzerland.
- Systems Engineering Estimation and Decision Support (SEED) at the University of the West of England CEMS, Bristol, England, UK.
- Technical University of Hamburg, Hamburg, Germany.
- UCL Centre for Systems Engineering (UCLse) in the Mullard Space Science Laboratory, London, England, UK.
- Research Centre for Automatic Control (CRAN), joint research unit with Nancy-Université and CNRS, Nancy, France

In the USA:

- GTRI Electronic Systems Laboratory (ELSYS) at the Georgia Tech Research Institute, Atlanta, Georgia, USA.
- GTRI Aerospace, Transportation and Advanced Systems Laboratory at the Georgia Tech Research Institute, Atlanta, Georgia, USA.
- Systems Engineering Research Center (SERC) at Stevens Institute of Technology, Hoboken, New Jersey, USA.
- Western Transportation Institute at Montana State University, Montana, USA.

In the Caribbean:

- INTEC Instituto Tecnológico de Santo Domingo at Los Proceres, Santo Domingo, Dominican Republic.

== See also ==
- List of types of systems engineering
- List of systems engineering books (WikiProject System list)
- List of systems engineers
- List of systems science organizations
