= Education in Norway =

Norwegian Ministry of Education and Research
- Minister of Education: Kari Nessa Nordtun (Ap)

National education budget (N/A)
- Budget: N/A

General details
- Primary languages: Norwegian (Bokmål and Nynorsk)
- System type: National
- Current system: Kunnskapsløftet, since the 2006–2007 academic year

Literacy (2015)
- Total: 100%
- Male: 100%
- Female: 100%

Enrollment
- Total: n/a
- Primary: 99.9% (graduating)
- Secondary: N/A
- Post secondary: 82% (graduating)

Attainment
- Secondary diploma: N/A
- Post-secondary diploma: N/A
- Secondary and tertiary education divided in academic and vocational systems

Education in Norway is mandatory for all children aged from 6 to 16. Schools are typically divided into two divisions: primary and lower secondary schooling. The majority of schools in Norway are municipal, where local governments fund and manage administration. Primary and lower secondary schools are available free of charge for all Norwegian citizens as a given right.

When primary and lower secondary education is completed, upper secondary schooling is entitled to students for enrollment, which prepares students for higher education or vocational studies.

The school year in Norway runs from mid-August to late June the following year. The Christmas holiday from mid-December to early January historically divides the Norwegian school year into two terms. Presently, the second term begins in January.

== History ==
Organized education in Norway dates as far back as 2000 B.C. Shortly after Norway became an archdiocese in 1153, cathedral schools were constructed to educate priests in Trondheim, Oslo, Bergen and Hamar.

After the Reformation of Norway in 1537, following the unification with Denmark in 1536, cathedral schools were turned into Latin schools, and it was made mandatory for all market towns to have such a school.

In 1736 training in reading was made compulsory for all children, but was not effective until some years later, when ambulatory schools (omgangsskoler) were also established. In 1827, Norway introduced the folkeskole ('people's school'), a primary school which became mandatory for seven years in 1889 and nine years in 1969. In the 1970s and 1980s, the folkeskole was abolished, and the grunnskole ('foundation school') was introduced.

Traditionally poorer counties like Finnmark and Hedmark have the highest shares of inhabitants who only have completed not compulsory primary education, with numbers as high as 38%.

Under the Independent Schools Act of 2003, private schooling in Norway has become available. However, very few such schools exist in comparison to Norwegian public schools. Private schools must be founded upon a curriculum used and recognized internationally or an alternative approach to teaching – either religious or pedagogical. These schools must be approved by the government and are heavily grant-aided, and cannot select students based on subjectivity, such as skill or intelligence.

== Education "today" ==
The Norwegian school system can be divided into three parts: elementary school (barneskole, ages 6–12), lower secondary school (ungdomsskole, ages 13–16), and upper secondary school (videregående skole, ages 16–19). The barneskole and ungdomsskole levels are compulsory, and are commonly referred to as grunnskole ('foundation school').

Elementary and lower secondary school are mandatory for all children aged 6–16. Before 1997, mandatory education in Norway started at the age of 7. Students often have to change schools when they enter lower secondary school and almost always have to change schools when they enter upper secondary school, as many schools only offer one of the levels.

While not compulsory, "camp school" (leirskole) stays are authorised in Section 2-3 of the Education Act and are defined as "training at a staffed camp school or other activity such as excursions or trips that are part of primary and secondary education with at least three consecutive nights".

=== Primary school (barneskole, years 1–7, ages 6–12) ===
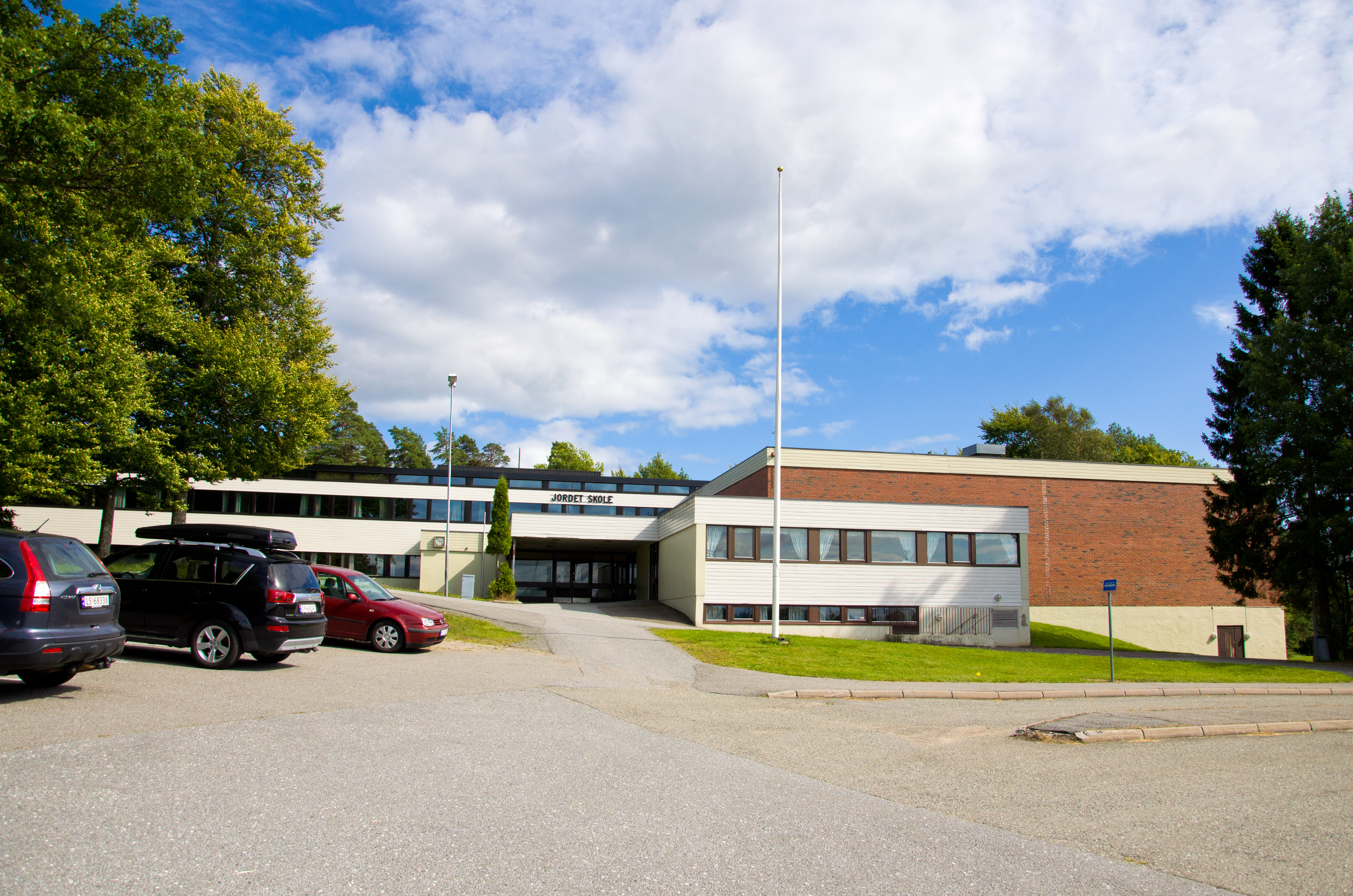
A primary school in Norway

In the first year of primary school, students spend most of their time playing educational games and learning social structures, the alphabet, basic addition and subtraction, and basic English skills. In years 2–7, they are introduced to mathematics, English, science, religion (focusing not only on Christianity but also on all other religions, their purpose, and their history), aesthetics, and music, complemented by geography, history, and social studies in the fifth year. No official grades are given at this level. However, the teacher often writes a comment, analysis, and sometimes an unofficial grade on tests. Tests are to be taken home and shown to parents. There is also an introductory test to let the teacher know if the student is above average or is in need of some assistance at school.

=== Lower secondary school (ungdomsskole, years 8–10, ages 13–16) ===
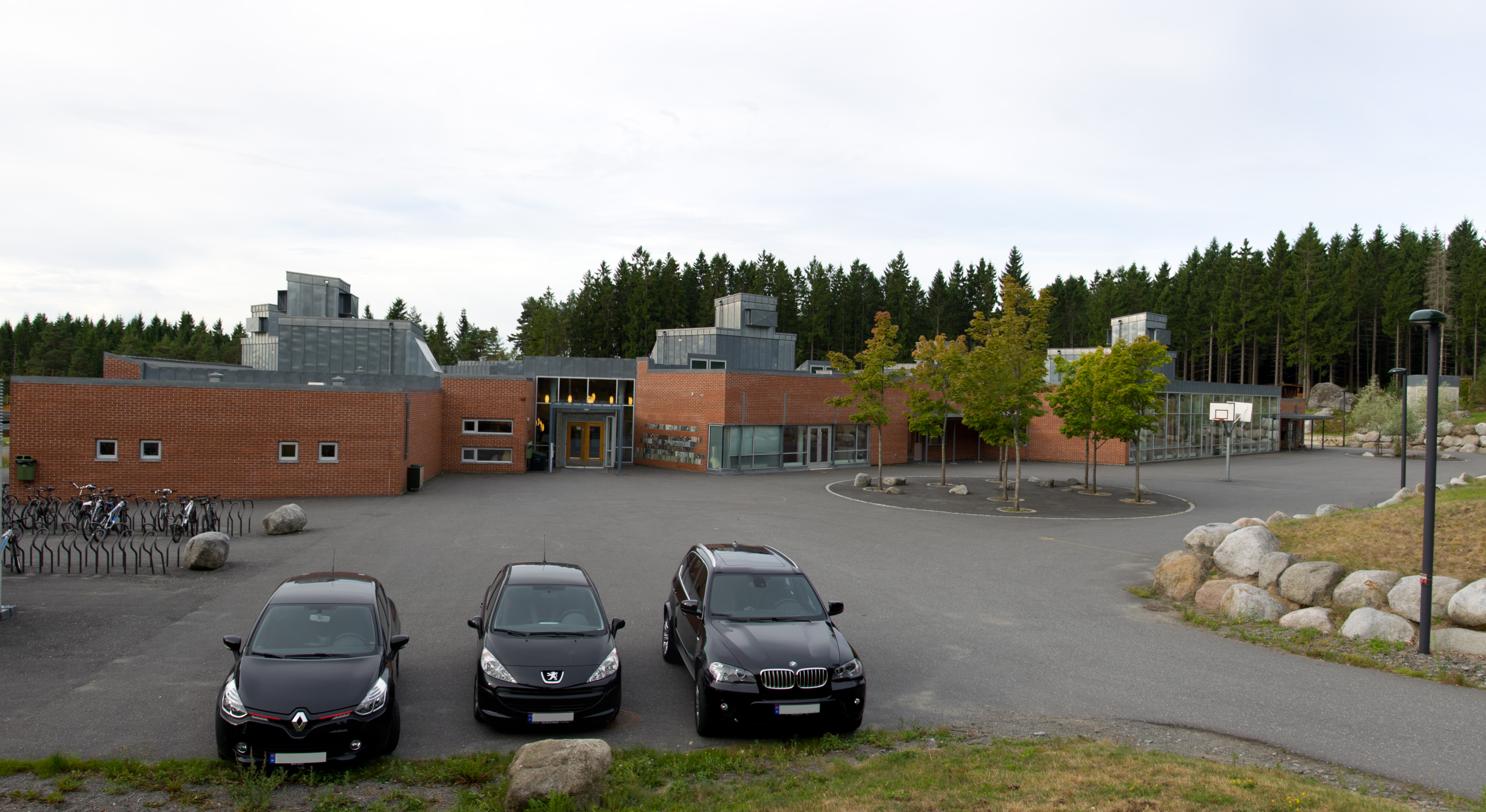
A lower secondary school in Norway

When the students enter lower secondary school, at age 12 or 13, they begin being graded on their work. Their grades together with their location in the country will determine whether they get accepted to their upper secondary school of choice or not. From the eighth year, students can choose one elective (valgfag) and one language. Typical offered languages are German, French, and Spanish as well as additional English and Norwegian studies. Before the educational reform of August 2006, students could choose a practical elective instead of the languages. Teens born in 1999 and later could once again choose a practical elective known as (arbeidslivsfag) or career studies upon starting lower secondary school, thus getting the option to choose two electives. The electives vary significantly between schools, even in the same municipality.

A student may take the year 10 exam in a particular subject early as long as he or she has been granted an exemption from further instruction in the elementary/middle school curriculum of that subject.

In 2009, Norwegian fifteen-year-olds performed better in OECDs Programme for International Student Assessment than other Scandinavian countries, with significant improvement since 2006. In mathematics; however, the top 10% were estimated to lag three years behind the top-scoring students in Shanghai.

Criticism has come (2024) from Sanna Sarromaa, a sociologist who has taught at Lower secondary level (in Norway): "One always waits for the slowest and" most stupid [pupils]"; furthermore, she says that the parents must "provide (for) all basic knowledge".

=== Upper secondary school (videregående skole, years 11-13, ages 16–19) ===
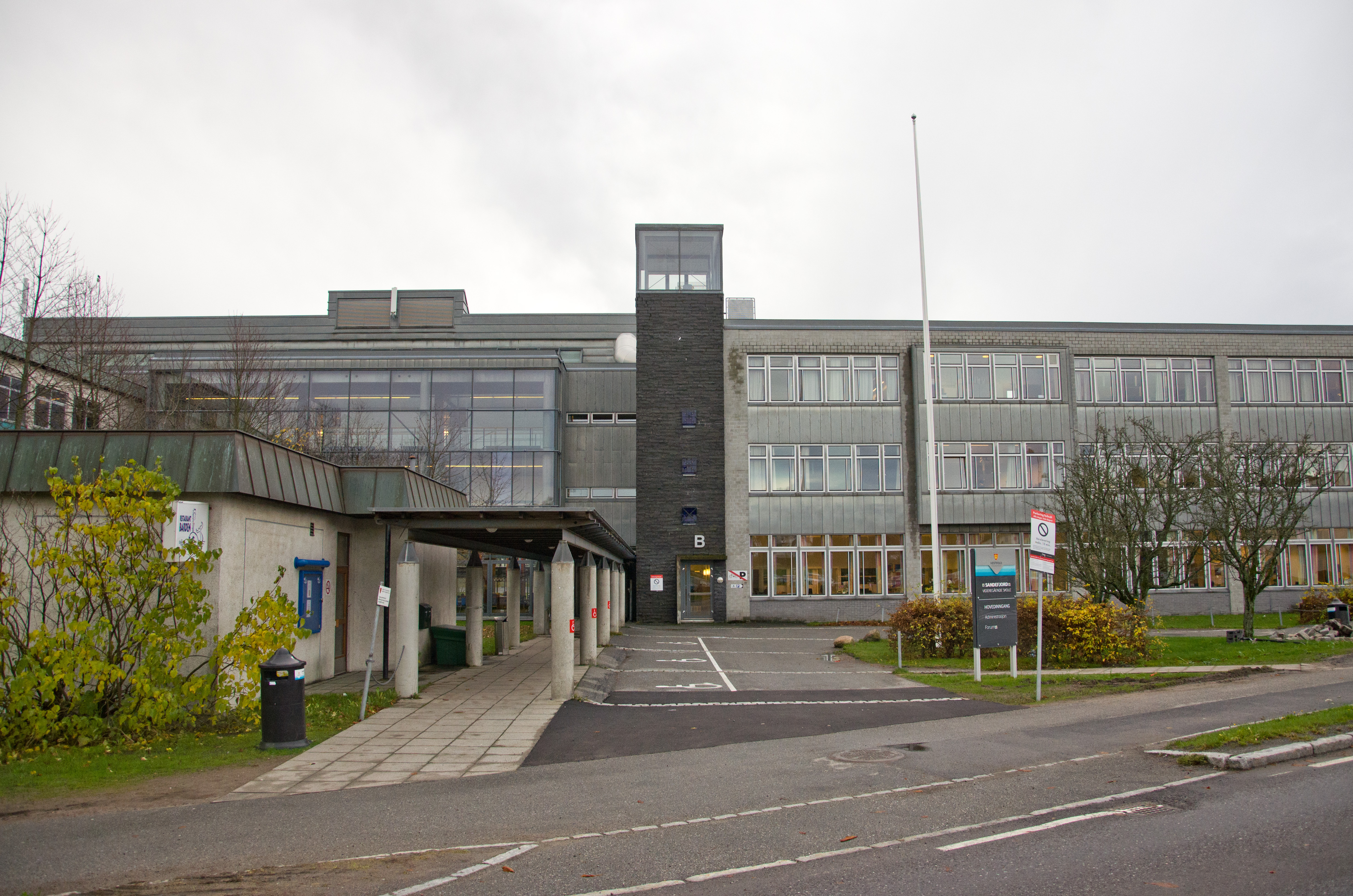
Sandefjord Upper Secondary School, the largest in Norway

Secondary education in Norway is primarily based on public schools: In 2007, 93% of upper secondary school students attended public schools. Until 2005, Norwegian law held private secondary schools to be illegal unless they offered a "religious or pedagogic alternative", so the only private schools in existence were religious (Christian), Steiner/Waldorf, Montessori schools, and Danielsen. The first "standard" private upper secondary schools opened in the fall of 2005. Videregående is the equivalent to high school.

As of 2017, graduation from videregående skole was at 73%.

Prior to 1994, there were three branches of upper secondary schooling: general (language, history, etc.), mercantile (accounting, etc.), and vocational (electronics, carpentry, etc.) studies. The high school reform of 1994 ("Reform 94") merged these branches into a single system. Among the goals of the reform was that all students should have a certain amount of general studies large enough to make them eligible for higher education later, meaning more theory in vocational studies, and that it should be possible to cross over from one education path to another without losing too much credit. In the old system, two years of carpentry would be wasted if one wanted to switch to general studies, but in the new system one could keep credit for at least half of it.

Since the introduction of the reform Kunnskapsløftet ('the knowledge promise' or 'the lifting of knowledge', the word løfte having two meanings) in the fall of 2006, a student can apply for a general studies (studieforberedelse) or a vocational studies (yrkesfag) path. Inside these main paths, there are many sub-paths to follow. An upper secondary school usually offers general and vocational curriculum. Vocational studies usually follow a typical structure named the "2+2 model": after two years of school training (with workshops and a short internship in industry), the student does an apprenticeship for two years in an enterprise or a public institution. The apprenticeship is divided into one year of training and one year of practical work. Some vocational curricula are nonetheless entirely school-based, and others include three years of apprenticeship instead of two.

The new reform makes the incorporation of IT into the schooling mandatory, and many counties (responsible for the public high schools) offer laptops to general studies students for free or for a small fee. Kunnskapsløftet also makes it harder to switch between electives that are taken in the second and third year in the general studies path.

Students graduating upper secondary school are called russ in Norwegian. They often celebrate with parties and festivities, which are held a few weeks before the final examinations of the final year.

=== Higher education ===
Higher education is anything beyond upper secondary school, and normally lasts three years or more. To be accepted to most higher education schools, a student must have attained a general university admissions certificate (generell studiekompetanse). This can be achieved by taking general studies while in upper secondary school or through the law of 23/5 where a person must be above 23 years of age, have five years of combined schooling and work experience and have passed exams in Norwegian, mathematics, natural sciences, English and social studies. Some degrees also require special electives in the second and third year (e.g. maths and physics for engineering studies.) The majority of higher educational institutions are run by the state and take responsibility for their own instruction, research, and dissemination of knowledge. The Norwegian Agency for Quality Assurance in Education (NOKUT), a professionally independent agency under the Ministry of Education and Research, assures the quality of higher education in Norway.

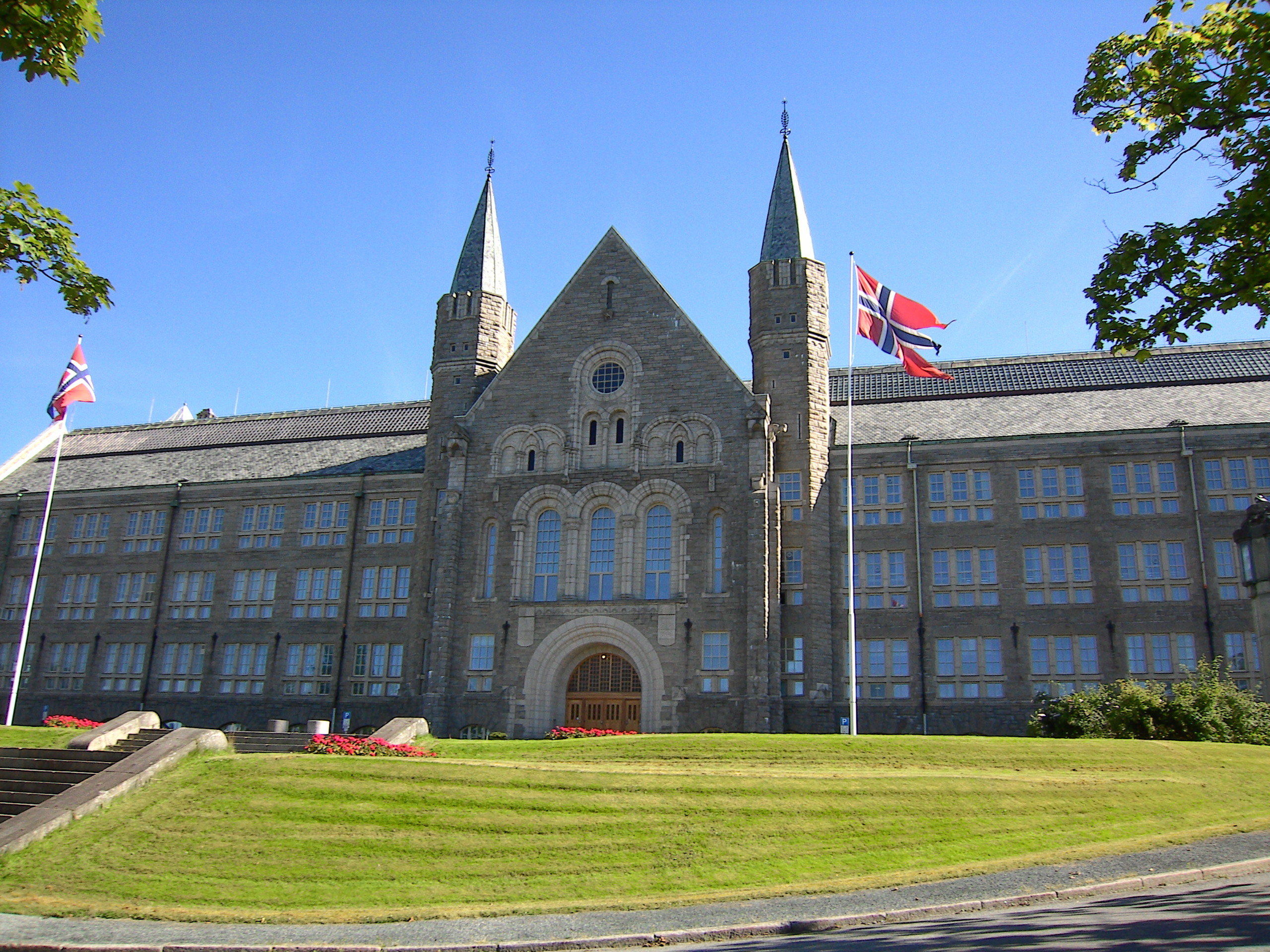
The main building of the Norwegian University of Science and Technology in Trondheim.

Where there are more applicants than students admitted, applicants are ranked based on their grades from upper secondary school. To gain access to studies commonly requiring a high GPA, like medicine, law and engineering, many students re-sit their upper secondary school examinations to improve their grades.

Higher education is broadly divided into:

- Universities, which concentrate on theoretical subjects (arts, humanities, natural science), supply bachelor (three years), master (five years) and PhD (eight years) titles. Universities also run a number of professional studies including law, medicine, dentistry, pharmacy and psychology. However, these are generally separate departments that have little to do with the rest of the university institution. Universities can offer their own curricula at any level without external accreditation.
- University colleges (høgskole), which supply a wide range of educational choices, including university degrees at bachelor, master and PhD levels, engineering degrees and professional vocations like teacher and nurse. University colleges are required to obtain accreditation from NOKUT for study programmes at the master's and PhD level. The grade system is the same as it is for universities.
- Private schools, which tend to specialize in popular subjects with limited capacity in public schools, such as business management, marketing or fine arts. Private schools are not common, although the fraction of students attending private schools is 10% in higher education, compared to 4% in secondary and 1.5% in primary education.

There is no formal distinction between vocational and non-vocational higher education.

=== Timeline of Norwegian higher education ===
Before the 19th century the main source for higher education of Norwegians was the University of Copenhagen.

- 1750: The Norwegian Military Academy is established as the "Free Mathematical School" with officer training and technical disciplines such as geographic surveying, drawing, fortification, and mathematics.
- 1757: The "Mining Seminar" is established at Kongsberg to train engineers for the Kongsberg Mines. This education was moved to the Royal Frederik's University in Christiania (Oslo) in 1814 (three years after the establishment of this university).
- 1811: The University of Oslo is established as Universitas Regia Fredericiana modeled on the University of Berlin (the "Humboldt Model").
- 1859: The Norwegian University of Life Sciences is established as an agricultural school at Ås, Akershus
- 1910: The Norwegian Institute of Technology is established in Trondheim.
- 1936: The Norwegian School of Economics is established in Bergen.
- 1943: The BI Norwegian Business School (BI) is established as a merchant school.
- 1946: The University of Bergen is established.
- 1961: The Oslo School of Architecture and Design is established.
- 1972: The University of Tromsø is established.
- 2005: Stavanger University College is given status as university, thus becoming the University of Stavanger.
- 2007: Agder University College (established 1994) is given status as university, thus becoming the University of Agder.
- 2011: Bodø University College becomes University of Nordland, the eighth university in Norway.
- 2014: Telemark University College, Buskerud University College and Vestfold University College merge to form the University College of South-Eastern Norway
- 2018: The University College of South-Eastern Norway gains university status, becoming the University of South-Eastern Norway
- 2026 Pupils from first through seventh grade, aged 6 to 13, should not be using AI.

== Special education ==
Norway's first large-scale education institution for people with intellectual disabilities was founded in 1898 by educator Emma Hjorth. Since the 1970s, the government has legislated the policy that all children should be educated in local schools. Since then, special education has taken place mostly in ordinary schools. The need for special education in school depends on the individual student's abilities and capabilities. Pupils who cannot manage to yield learning outcomes from the typical teaching style have a right to special education.

In special education, the Educational/Psychological Service maintains highly qualified specialists, educational psychologists, social welfare workers, and kindergarten teachers, playing the role of safety net in society. The Educational/Psychological Service visits school, provides students with help when needed, and assists their family members. In addition to the society system, special educators play a significant role, particularly in the content of their instructions.

According to The Act relating to Universities and Colleges, universities and university colleges must take responsibility for the students' learning environment. Institutions are expected to create an inclusive and flexible learning environment that represents universal design.

== Grading ==
Norway has multiple different grading systems, both unique ones and ones that have been based on foreign grading systems. The former most common system of grades used at university level was based on a scale running from 1.0 (worst) through 6.0 (best) with 4.0 or above being considered passing grades.

The way the new Bologna system was introduced implies that students who had started their studies while the old system still was in effect will graduate with transcripts containing grades from both systems (i.e. both numbers and letters).

Lower levels of education use a scale running from 1 through 6, with 6 being the highest and 2 the lowest passing grade. For non-final tests and mid-term evaluations the grades are often postfixed with + or - (except 6+ and 1-) and it is also common to use grades such as 5/6 or 4/3 indicating borderline grades. However, the grades students get on their final diploma are either 1, 2, 3, 4, 5 or 6.

== Examinations ==
At the conclusion of their school careers, upper secondary pupils aspire to graduate with a diploma. This is obtained by those who have passed all their subjects, and lists grades which are "based on teachers' determination of overall achievement marks of their own students." As well as these teacher-assigned grades, the students' diplomas may feature one or more examination grades. A minority of students will be chosen at random to sit an exam, a concept called trekkfag in Norwegian. The word fag means 'subject', whilst the verb å trekke can be translated as 'to draw, to pick', as one would describe picking a card from a pack. The dictionary translation of trekkfag is given as a description of the concept: "subjects students may be chosen to sit an exam for."

== Academic schedule ==
=== Academic year in Norway ===
In Norway's schools, there are two semesters. The new academic year begins in the middle of August. The first semester begins in August and ends in December. The second semester begins in January and ends in June.

=== Breaks ===
In Norway's school, there are several long vacations. For example, after the academic year ends in June, students in Norway have summer vacation, which is eight weeks from the middle of June until the middle of August. They also have Christmas holidays after the first semester ends in December until the second semester begins in January. In addition, in the last week of October, pupils in primary, lower secondary and upper secondary schools have fall break, with another week-long break (winter break) in the middle of February. Students at universities or university colleges typically do not have fall and winter breaks.

=== National holidays ===
In Norway, there are thirteen national holidays that students are free from school. In the middle of April, there are four days of Easter break. Norway celebrates International Workers' Day on May 1 and its Constitution Day on May 17. Furthermore, Norway also celebrates Ascension Day in May, with the exact date depending on the each year. Ten days after Ascension Day, the country celebrates Pentecost, and Whit Monday the next day. Students do not have to attend school on these national holidays. However, some of the holidays are included in the long break. For example, New Year's Day and Christmas are national holidays in Norway, but students have Christmas holidays at that time.

== Educators in Norwegian schools ==
The titles of educators in Norwegian schools vary with the degrees they have.

- Preschool teacher (førskolelærer or barnehagelærer): These teachers are primarily employed in kindergartens and the first four years of primary school. To become a preschool teacher in Norway, a bachelor's degree from a university college is required.
- Adjunct teacher (adjunkt): These teachers primarily work between the 5th and 10th years of lower secondary school, but some are also employed in high schools, usually in minor subjects. To become an adjunct requires a bachelor's degree in a particular subject from a university or university college. Many adjuncts have studied other courses at a lower level, which they teach as a secondary subject (a mathematics teacher may have studied physics at a lower level, but teaches both). In addition, a one-year course in pedagogy is required.
- Lecturer (lektor): Lecturers work in upper secondary school and high schools, from 8th year up to the third year of high school. Lecturers have a master's degree from a university, along with a pedagogy course. Lecturers usually have a more academic approach to teaching than other teachers.

== See also ==
- List of universities in Norway
- Open access in Norway
