= Examen artium =

Academic certification conferred in Denmark and Norway

Examen artium was the name of the academic certification conferred in Denmark and Norway, qualifying the student for admission to university studies. Examen artium was originally introduced as the entrance exam of the University of Copenhagen in 1630. The University of Copenhagen was the only university of Denmark–Norway until The Royal Frederick University in Christiania was founded in 1811.

In Norway, examen artium was formally discontinued after the 1982 class (but the term is still sometimes used informally to denote the diploma from today's videregående skole).

== Norway ==
Typically after their tenth and final year of compulsory primary school education, students applied for admission to a three-year programs of studies, called "lines" at schools called gymnas within their counties. The curricula for the lines included a core of general studies topics, including Norwegian, mathematics, history, English, physical education, and one natural science subject.

The curricula of the individual lines emphasized particular subjects. Examples include:

- Latin, with an emphasis on classical languages and works
- Realfag, with an emphasis on mathematics and physics
- English, with an emphasis on English and French language and literature
- Natural sciences, with an emphasis on mathematics, biology, and chemistry

Students' final grades were based on the grading of their classroom work and the grades achieved at standardized examinations. Such examinations were either written for core and emphasized subjects, or oral for all subjects. Written examinations were mandatory for bokmål, nynorsk, and English final essay, and at least two other subjects. Oral examinations were given by drawing lot.

In principle, examen artium gave students eligibility to matriculate in Norwegian and foreign universities. However, some programs would limit eligibility to certain lines as well as academic performance within these lines. For example, Norwegian medical and engineering programs would only consider applications from realfag and natural sciences.
