= Philip Houm =

Norwegian literary critic

- Born: 20 April 1911; Kristiania, Norway
- Died: 22 April 1990 (aged 79); Bærum
- Occupation: Literary critic

Philip Rode Houm (20 April 1911 – 22 April 1990) was a Norwegian literary critic.

== Biography ==
He was born in Kristiania (now Oslo), Norway. He graduated with a master's degree in literature from the Royal Frederick University in 1938, Houm was a co-editor in the journal Kølen 1942-45. He worked as literary critic for the newspaper Dagbladet from 1945.

He was a board member of Nationaltheatret from 1963, a member of Norwegian Language Committee (Norsk språknemnd) from 1966 to 1972, and of the Norwegian Language Council from 1972 to 1976.

In 1947, he was commissioned by Aschehoug to write a closing volume to their series on Norwegian literature history. Norges litteratur fra 1914 til 1950-årene was published in 1955. Among his other books were Ask Burlefot og vi (1957) and Kritikere i en gullalder (1982).

Houm died in Bærum and was buried in the churchyard of Haslum Church. He was a grandfather of Nicolai Houm.
