= Eik Normal School =

Norwegian school for teacher education

Eik Normal School (Norwegian: Eik lærerhøgskole) was a Norwegian school for teacher education.

== History ==
The school was established in Horten in 1958 as the Vestfold State Normal School (Statens lærerskoleklasser i Vestfold) with H. K. Heimdal as its first chancellor. The school was renamed Eik Public Normal School (Eik offentlige lærerskole) in 1962 and Eik Normal School (Eik lærerskole) in 1967 (modified to Eik lærerhøgskole in 1981). In 1994 it became part of Vestfold University College.

== Staff and alumni ==
- Ruth Lagesen (1914–2005), instructor at the school
