= Ruth Lagesen =

Norwegian pianist and conductor

Ruth Lagesen (August 10, 1914 – April 7, 2005) was a Norwegian pianist and conductor.

== Biography ==
Lagesen was born in Bagn in the Valdres district. She started studying in 1933 with Mary Barratt Due, Nils Larsen, and Erling Westher in Oslo, and she debuted as a pianist at the University of Oslo's Aula Hall in 1935 with the Oslo Philharmonic. After further study in Brussels and London, in 1938 she settled in Larvik, working for the Treschow family at Fritzøehus. After the Second World War, she established the town's Cecilia Society in 1945 and served as the head of NRK's junior orchestra from 1947 to 1951. Lagesen was often featured by NRK as a soloist with the Norwegian Radio Orchestra and she also appeared on TV abroad. She distinguished herself in 1949 as Norway's first female orchestra conductor. She was known for conducting a number of large-scale works, including Handel's Messiah and Bach's passions. In 1977 she conducted Bach's Christmas Oratorio from Kongsberg Church in three programs on NRK Television.

After studying in Paris with Nadia Boulanger and Eugène Bigot from 1955 to 1957, with classmates Per Nørgård and Mikis Theodorakis, she took a conducting exam and became a music teacher at Eik Normal School. She established the Friends of Music Society in Tønsberg and Larvik, as well as the Larvik Boys' Choir and Music Society. She conducted the royal-sponsored Robert Riefling seminar in 1968 and 1969. As a conductor, she led the Oslo Philharmonic, Bergen Philharmonic Orchestra, Norwegian Radio Orchestra, and Trondheim Chamber Orchestra. Lagesen was on the board of the Norwegian National Academy of Opera. As late as 1993, she lectured at the Norwegian Academy of Music on Edvard Grieg and his work for piano students.

Lagesen died at age 90 in Larvik.
