= Nicolai Houm =

Norwegian novelist

Nicolai Houm (born 25 August 1974) is a Norwegian novelist.

He is a grandson of literary critic Philip Houm, and grew up at Jar except for some years in the United States. He studied at the writers' course at Telemark University College, and later lived at Grønland, Oslo before buying a small farm in Sylling.

He made his novel debut with Knekk nakken min venn in 2004, and followed with the short story collection Alle barn er laget av ild in 2009 and the children's book Når alle sover in 2011. In 2013 he released De håpefulle, an ambitious 700-page family saga which was compared by Norwegian critics to The Corrections. He is also a part-time editor for the publishing house Cappelen Damm.

The Gradual Disappearance of Jane Ashland, translated by Anna Paterson, was published by Tin House Books in October 2018.
