= List of types of systems engineering =

This list of types of systems engineering gives an overview of the types of systems engineering. The reference section gives an overview of major publications in each field and the universities that offer these programs. Universities can be listed here under multiple specialism. A general list of universities that offer SE programs is given in the List of systems engineering at universities.

== B ==
- Biological systems engineering

== C ==
- Communications system engineering, see telecommunication
- Computer systems engineering, see also computer engineering
- Computer science and systems engineering, see also computer science
- Control systems engineering, see also control engineering

== E ==
- Earth systems engineering and management
- Electronic systems engineering, see also electronic engineering
- Enterprise systems engineering
- Environmental systems engineering, see also environmental engineering

== I ==
- Information systems engineering, see also information science
- Integrating functionality

== M ==
- Manufacturing systems engineering, see also industrial engineering
- Marine systems engineering, see also naval architecture
- Mechanical and systems engineering, see also mechanical engineering

== P ==
- Petroleum systems engineering, see also petroleum engineering
- Power systems engineering, see also power engineering
- Process systems engineering, see also industrial engineering

== S ==
- Software systems engineering, see also software engineering
- Space systems engineering, see also aerospace engineering
- Structural systems engineering, see also structural engineering
- Systems and information engineering, see also information science
- Systems engineering management, see also systems engineering

== See also ==
- List of systems engineering at universities
- List of systems engineering books (WPS list)
- List of systems engineers
- List of types of systems theory
