= University of South-Eastern Norway =

State owned university in eastern Norway

- Universitetet i Sørøst-Norge
- Symbol
- Type: Public university
- Established: 4 May 2018; 8 years ago
- Vice-Chancellor: Pia Cecilie Bing-Jonsson
- Students: ~17,000 (2023)
- Location: Bø i Telemark, Porsgrunn, Notodden, Rauland, Drammen, Hønefoss, Kongsberg, Horten, Norway; 59.1388°N 9.6724°E
- Website: usn.no

The University of South-Eastern Norway (Norwegian: Universitetet i Sørøst-Norge), commonly known as USN, is a Norwegian state university. It has campuses in Bø in Telemark, Porsgrunn, Notodden, Rauland, Drammen, Hønefoss, Kongsberg and Horten. USN is a continuation of the three former university colleges, Telemark University College, Buskerud University College and Vestfold University College, which merged between 2014 and 2016 to form the University College of South-Eastern Norway. The institution was granted the status of a full university by the King-in-Council on 4 May 2018.

USN has 88 undergraduate programs, 44 master's programs and 8 PhD programs. Measured in the number of students, USN is the fourth largest University in Norway with approximately 17,000 students and 1,900 staff, spread over eight campuses. The university is exclusively offering several courses in Norway, such as optician study in Kongsberg.

== History ==
Buskerud University College and Vestfold University College merged to Buskerud and Vestfold University College in 2014. On 4 June 2015, the boards on University College in Buskerud and Vestfold approved a proposal along with Telemark University College to ask the government to merge the educational institutions. The Storting's consideration of Report to the Storting no. 18 (2014–2015) Konsentrasjon for kvalitet – strukturreform i universitets- og høyskolesektoren found place on 11 June. The institutions were formally merged on 19 June through Royal Decree with effect from 1 January 2016.

The merger decision from the respective directors at Buskerud and Vestfold University College and Telemark University College, asked that the name of the merged school should be University College of South-Eastern Norway with merger date 1 January 2016. It was also specified in the board decision that the purpose of the merge was to become a university. An application to be granted status as a university was sent for assessment by NOKUT in 2017, and NOKUT issued its recommendation that the institution meet the criteria for university status in April 2018. The institution was granted status as a university under the name University of South-Eastern Norway in King-in-Council on 4 May 2018.

== Organization ==
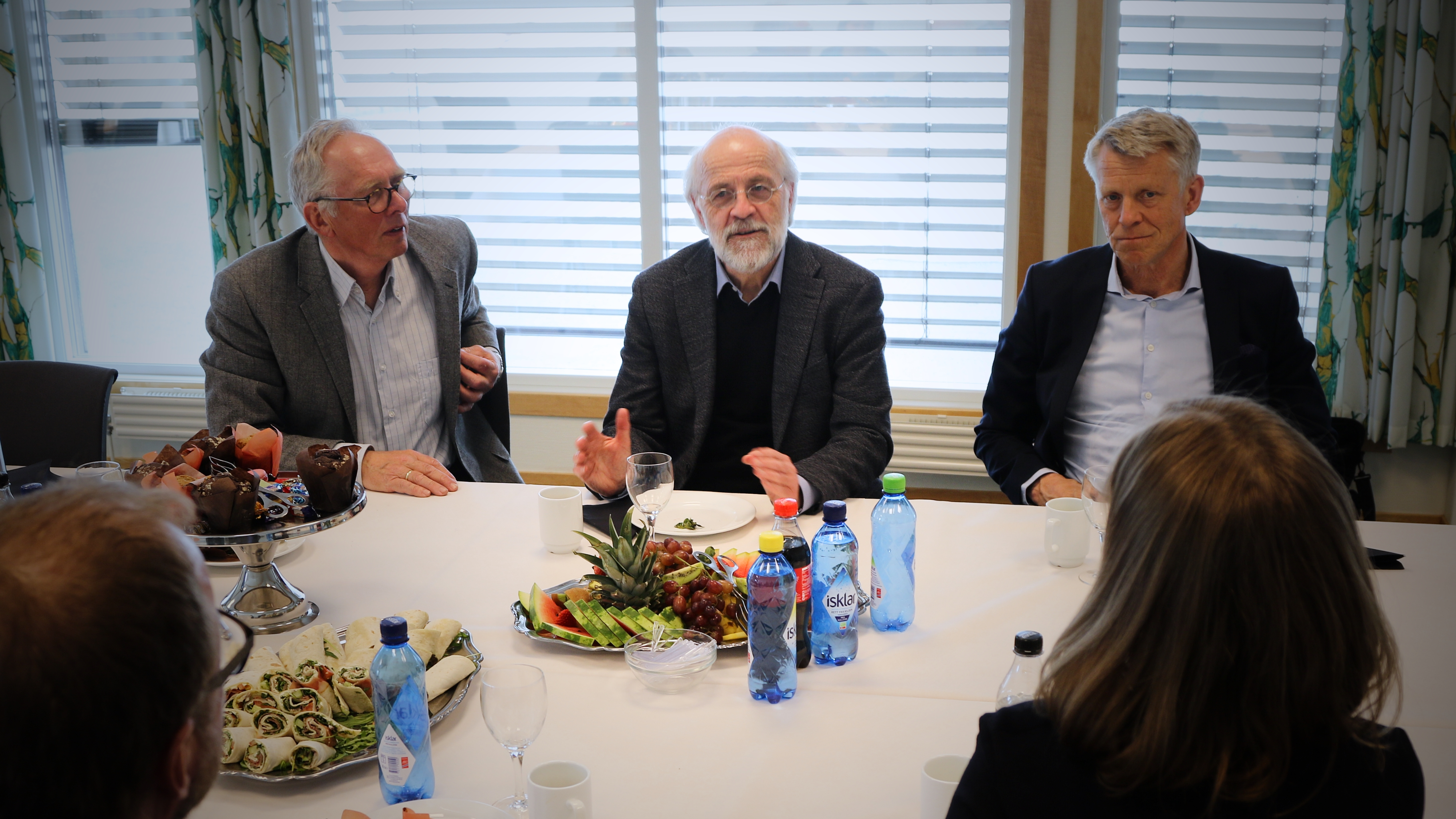
Chairman of the board Rune Nilsen, Rector Petter Aasen and Vice-Rector Nils Kristian Bogen in conversation with Minister of Research and Higher Education Iselin Nybø (V) on campus Bø. Photo: Stian K. Sande.

=== Management ===
The rectorate at USN consists of rector Petter Aasen, vice-rector Nils Kristian Bogen and vice-rectors Ingvild Marheim Larsen and Heidi Kristin Ormstad. The chairman of the board is Professor Tore Isaksen.

In addition to the rectorate, USN's management team consists of the four deans, six directors and a chief of staff.

=== Faculties and departments ===
From 1 January 2017, the former 8 faculties at Telemark University College and Buskerud and Vestfold University College became 4 faculties and the former 36 departments became 20.

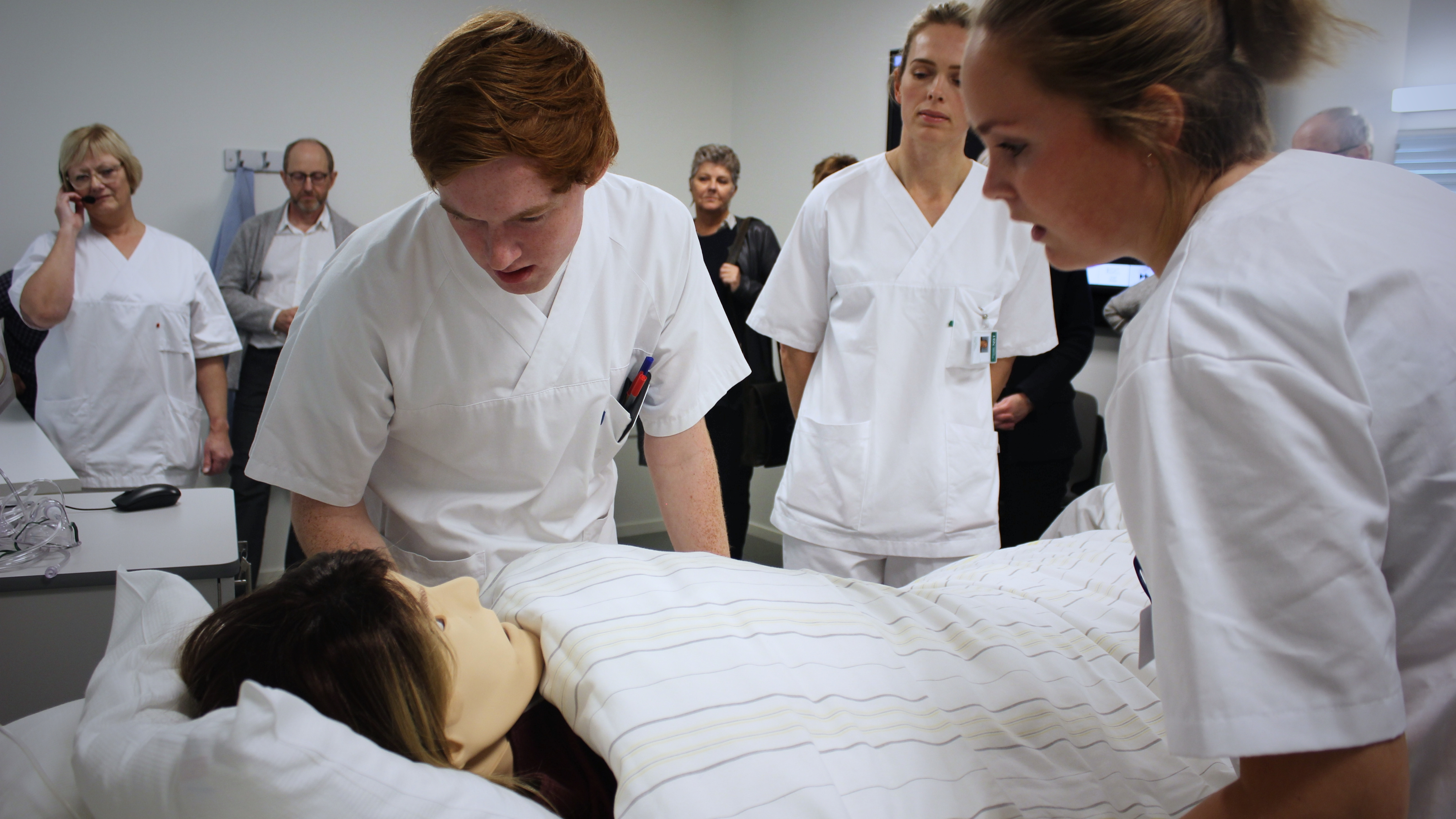
Nursing students practice in the simulation center on the Porsgrunn campus during the official opening of the center. Photo: Stian Kristoffer Sande.

==== Faculty of Health and Social Sciences ====
The Faculty of Health and Social Sciences offers studies in nursing, social care, child welfare, radiography, lighting design and optometry. USN is also the only Norwegian educational institution that offers optician education. The faculty is led as of 26 August 2023 by Dean Pia Cecilie Bing-Jonsson. The faculty director is Kine Strand Bye. In addition to the professional studies, the faculty offers a number of master's programs, and a PhD program in person-oriented health work.

The faculty has the following departments:

- Department of Nursing and Health Sciences.
- Department of Health, Social and Welfare Studies.
- Department of Optometry, Radiography and Lighting Design.

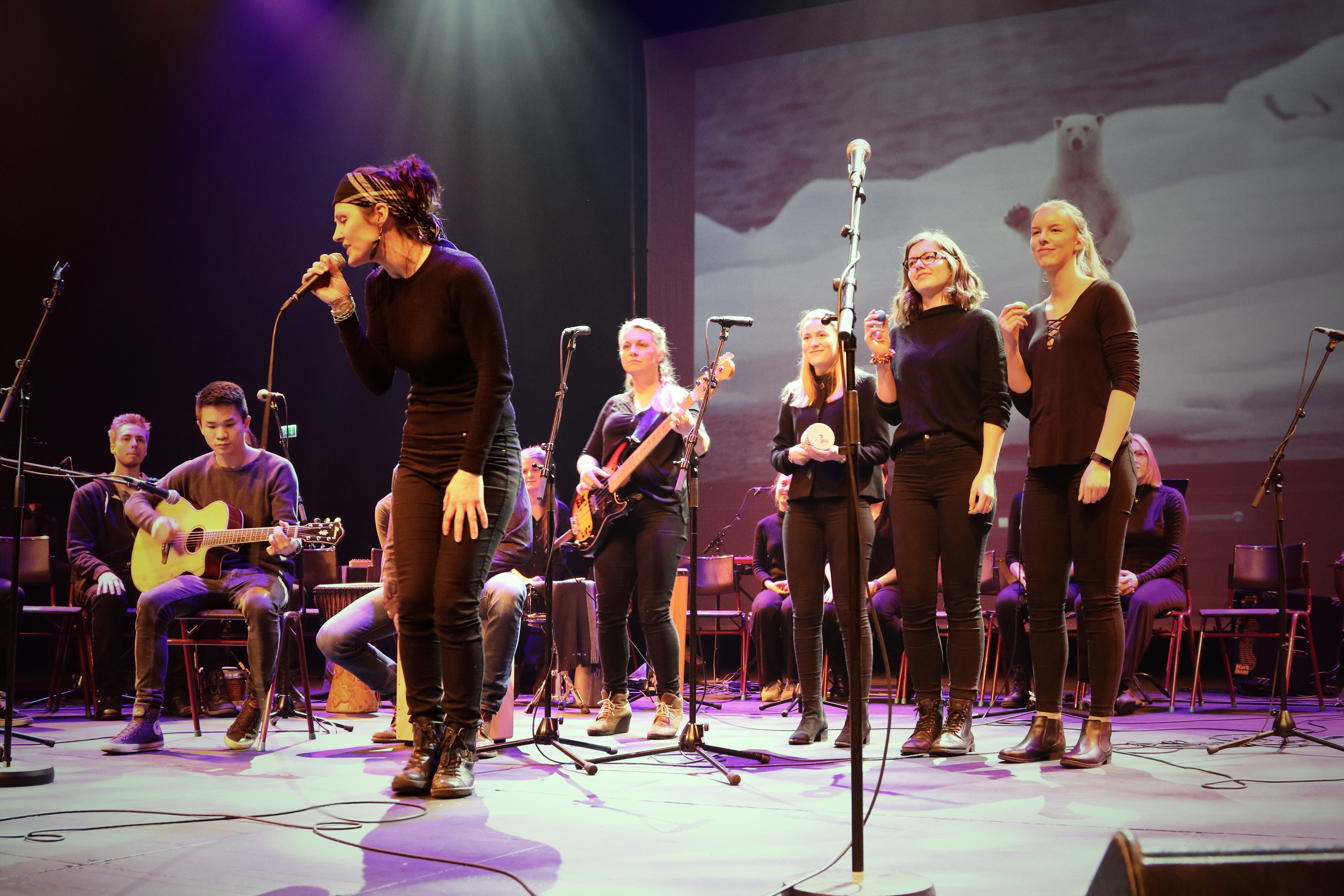
USN's music students perform self-produced pieces of music in the Bakkenteigen Concert Hall on Campus Vestfold. Photo: Stian Kristoffer Sande.

==== Faculty of Humanities, Sports and Educational Science ====
The Faculty of Humanities, Sports and Educational Sciences offers both studies in major professional educations such as primary school teachers and kindergarten teachers and studies in disciplinary traditions such as art, culture, folk music and sports. As of 26 August 2023, the faculty is headed by Dean Per-Ludvik Kjendlie. The faculty director is Bent Kristiansen.

The faculty has the following departments:

- Department of Culture, Religion and Social Studies
- Department of Educational Science
- Department of Mathematics and Science Education
- Department of Languages and Literature Studies
- Department of Sports, Physical Education and Outdoor Studies
- Department of Traditional Arts and Traditional Music
- Department of Visual and Performing Arts Education

==== USN School of Business ====
USN Business School offers bachelor's and master's programs as well as a PhD program in Marketing Management. In addition, several year studies and further education studies are offered.

- Department of Business and IT
- Department of Business, History and Social Sciences
- Department of Business, Marketing and Law
- Department of Business, Strategy and Political Sciences

==== Faculty of Technology, Natural Sciences and Maritime Sciences ====
The Faculty of Technology, Natural Sciences and Maritime Sciences has the following departments at different campuses:

- Department of Electrical Engineering, IT and Cybernetics
- Department of Maritime Operations
- Department of Microsystems
- Department of Natural Sciences and Environmental Health
- Department of Process, Energy and Environmental Technology
- Department of Science and Industry Systems

== External cooperation ==
USN collaborates with the region's business community on research, development and innovation projects, and employs people from the business community in assistantships at the institution in connection with such projects. These people are employed in a 20 percent position at USN, and work on projects that focus on practically useful issues for companies. As of 2018, USN has employed people from FMC Technologies, GE Vingmed Ultrasound, Semcon Devotek, Skagerak Energi, Conexus AS, TechnipFMC, Sopra Steria and Kongsberg Group.

=== Condemnation of Israel and ending agreements with Israeli partners ===
On February 19, 2024, Rector Pia Cecilie Bing-Jonsson announced that because of "Israel's attack on Gaza's civilian population and infrastructure" the university would end cooperation agreements with the University of Haifa and Hadassah Academic College. The decision was criticized by Norwegian professor Torkel Brekke, who claimed in an editorial in the Wall Street Journal that the decision is indicative of a "post-Holocaust strain of antisemitism... cloaked under another name—'anti-Zionism'".

== Notable alumni ==
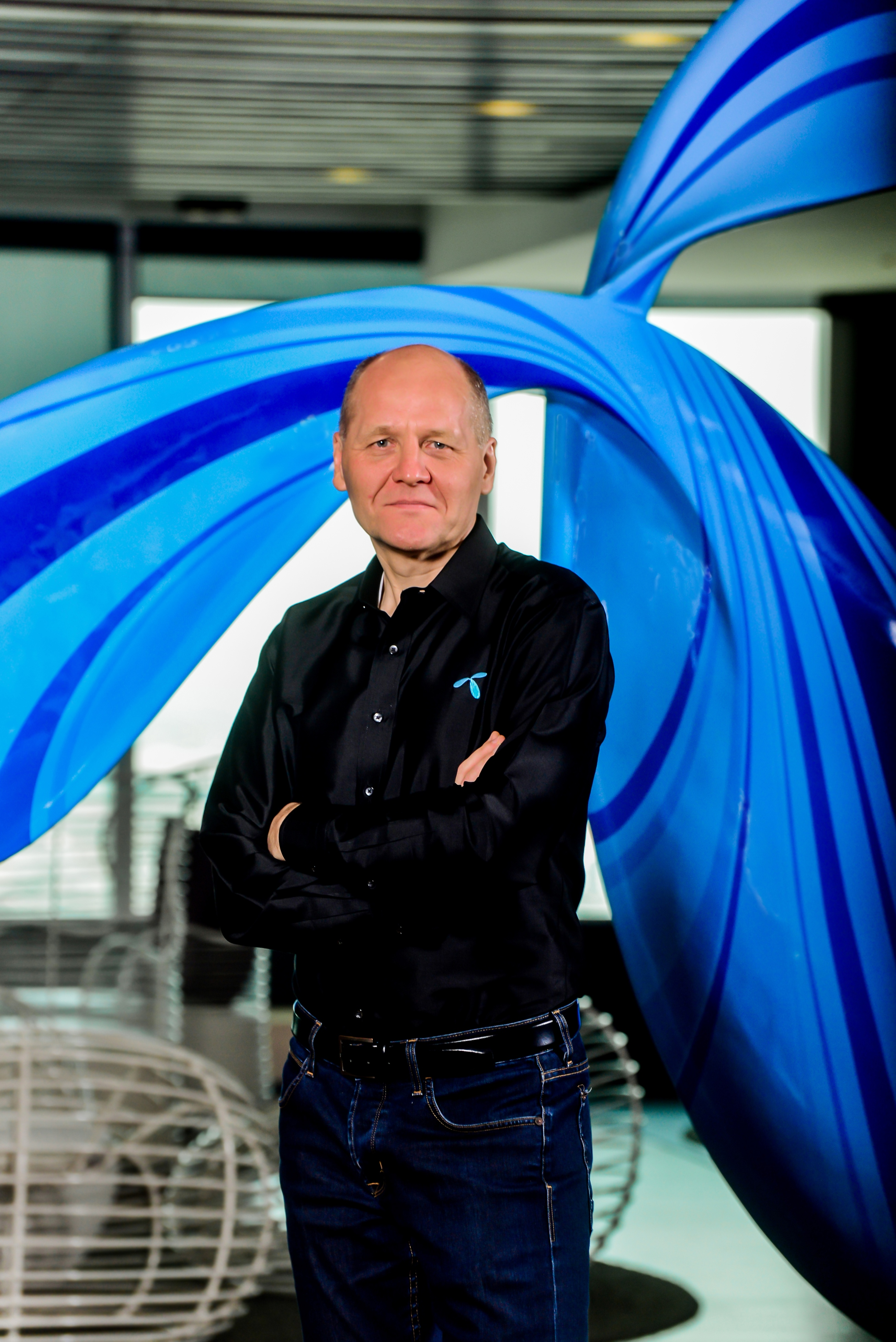
Sigve Brekke

The University of South-Eastern Norway is a continuation of three former university colleges and one of the newest full universities in Norway, hence its academics and alumni include notable people from before the merging.

- Sigve Brekke – President and CEO of Telenor Group
- Eli Blakstad – politician for the Centre Party
- Halvor Kleppen – media personality, theme park owner and writer
- Nicolai Houm – novelist
- Sindre Fossum Beyer – politician for the Labour Party
- Trude Marstein – author

== Gallery ==
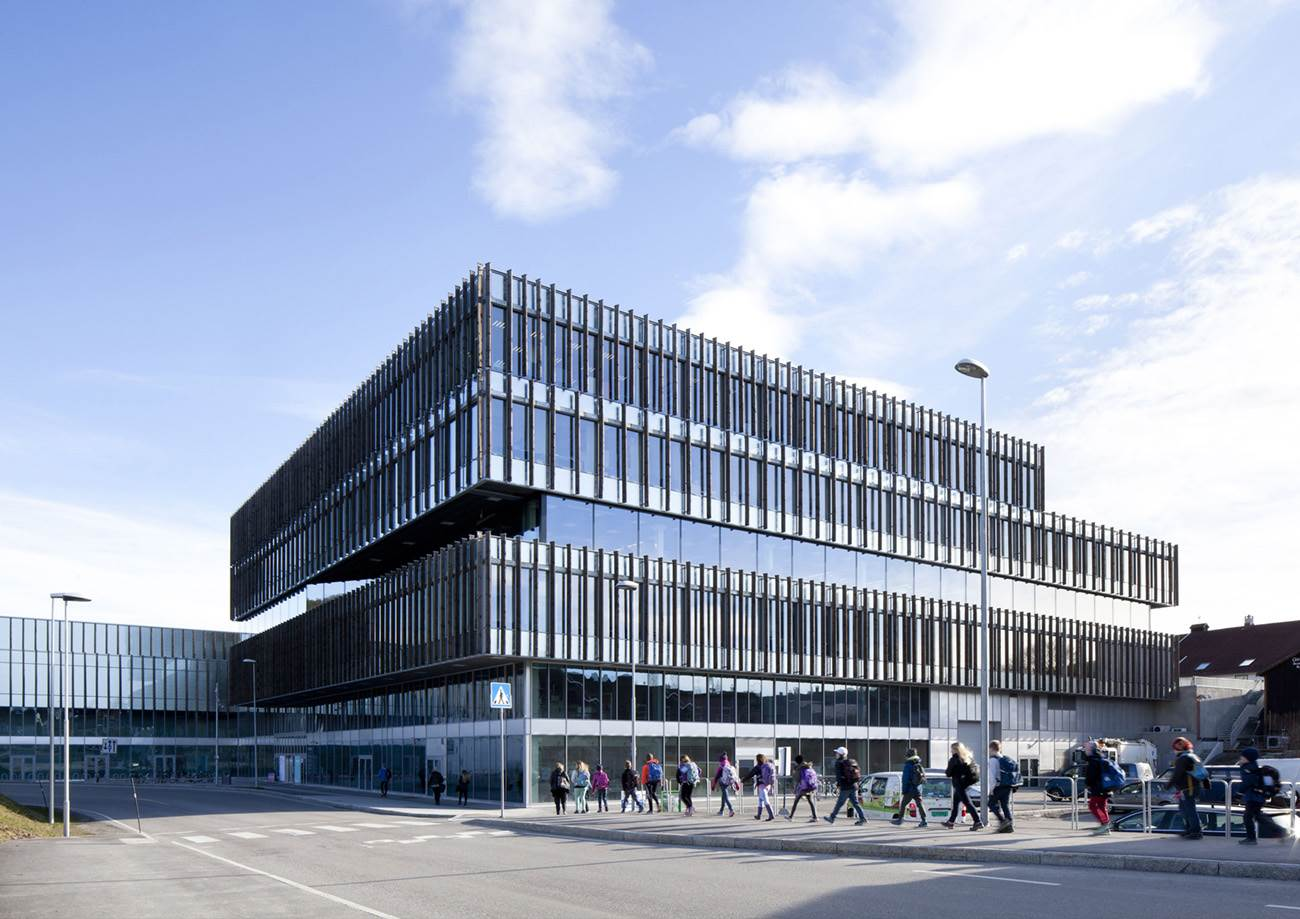
Campus Kongsberg

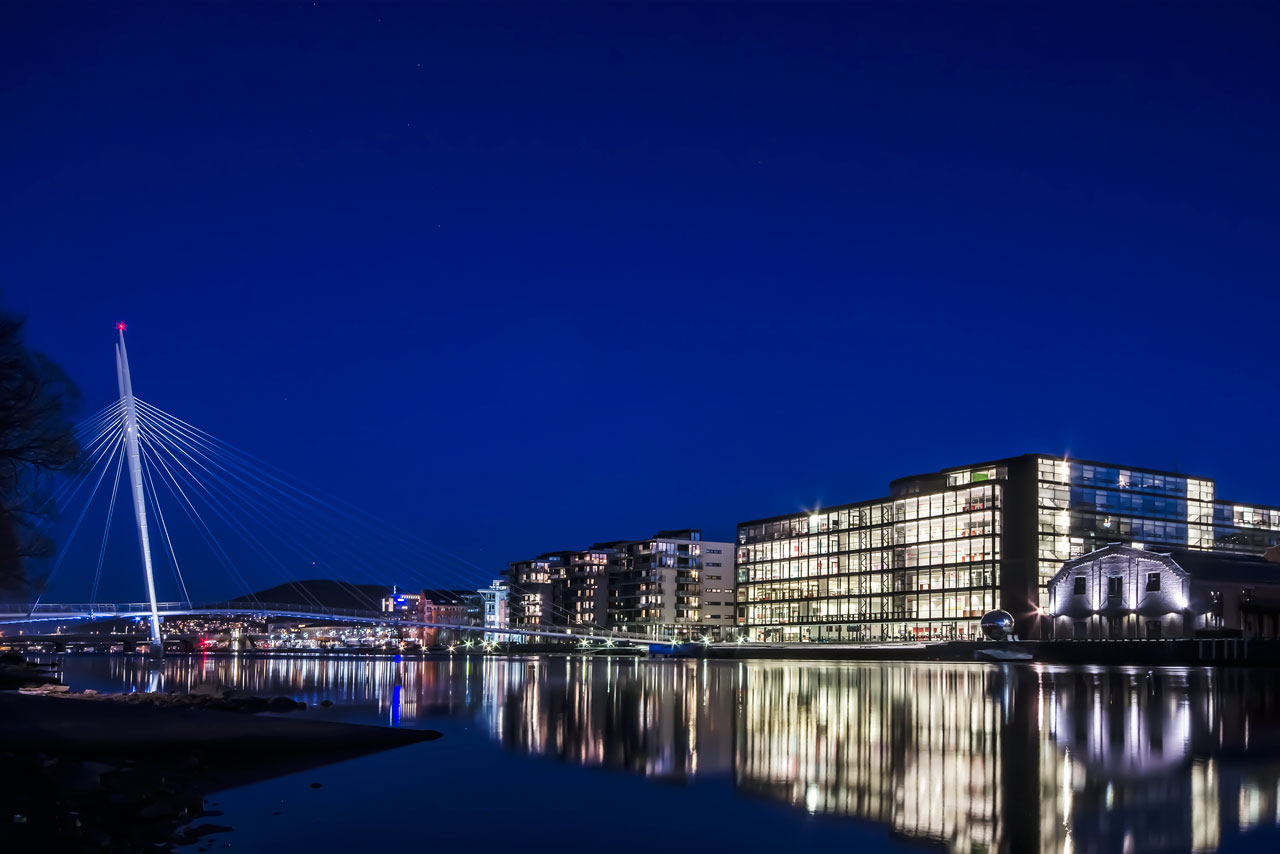
Campus Drammen

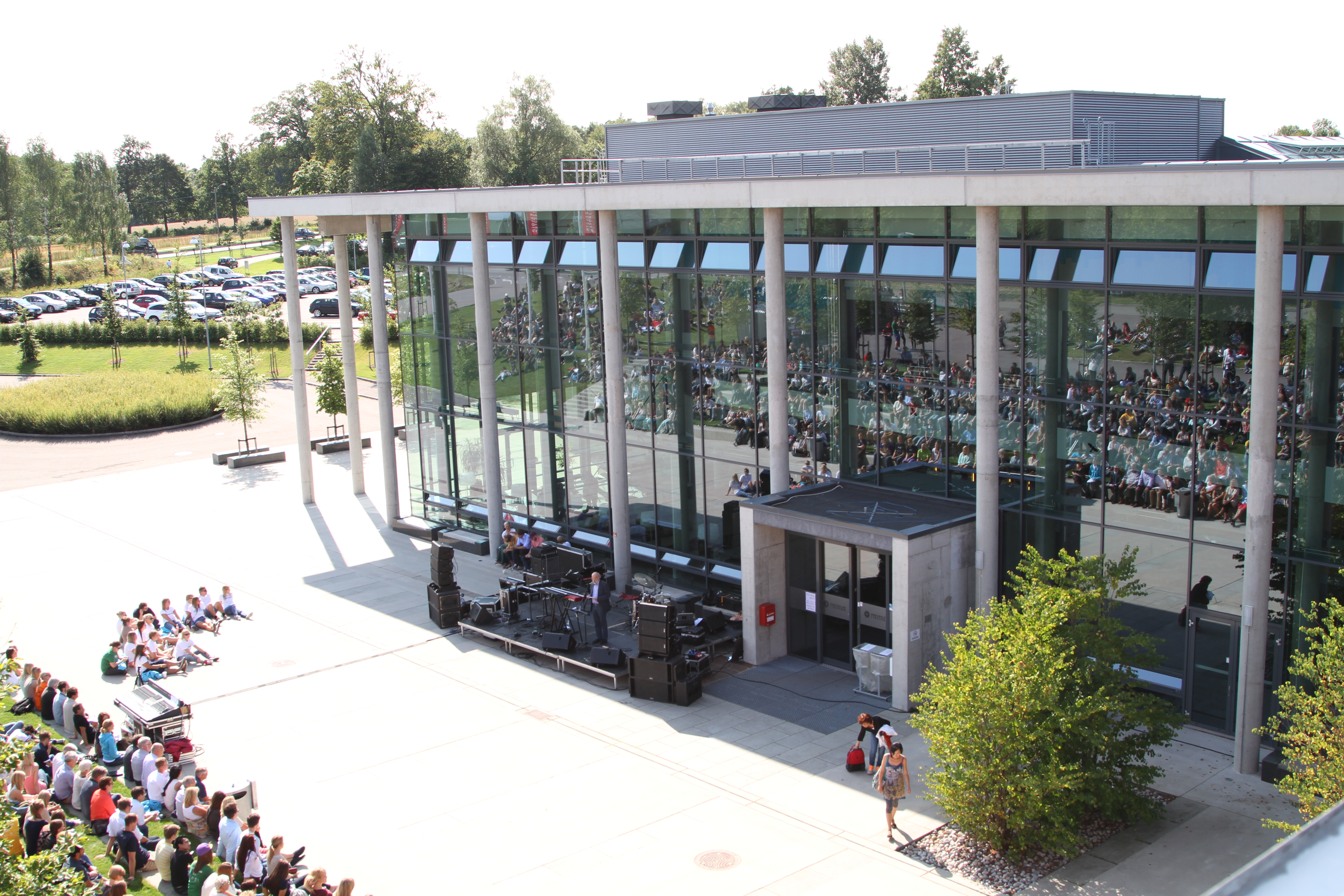
Campus Vestfold

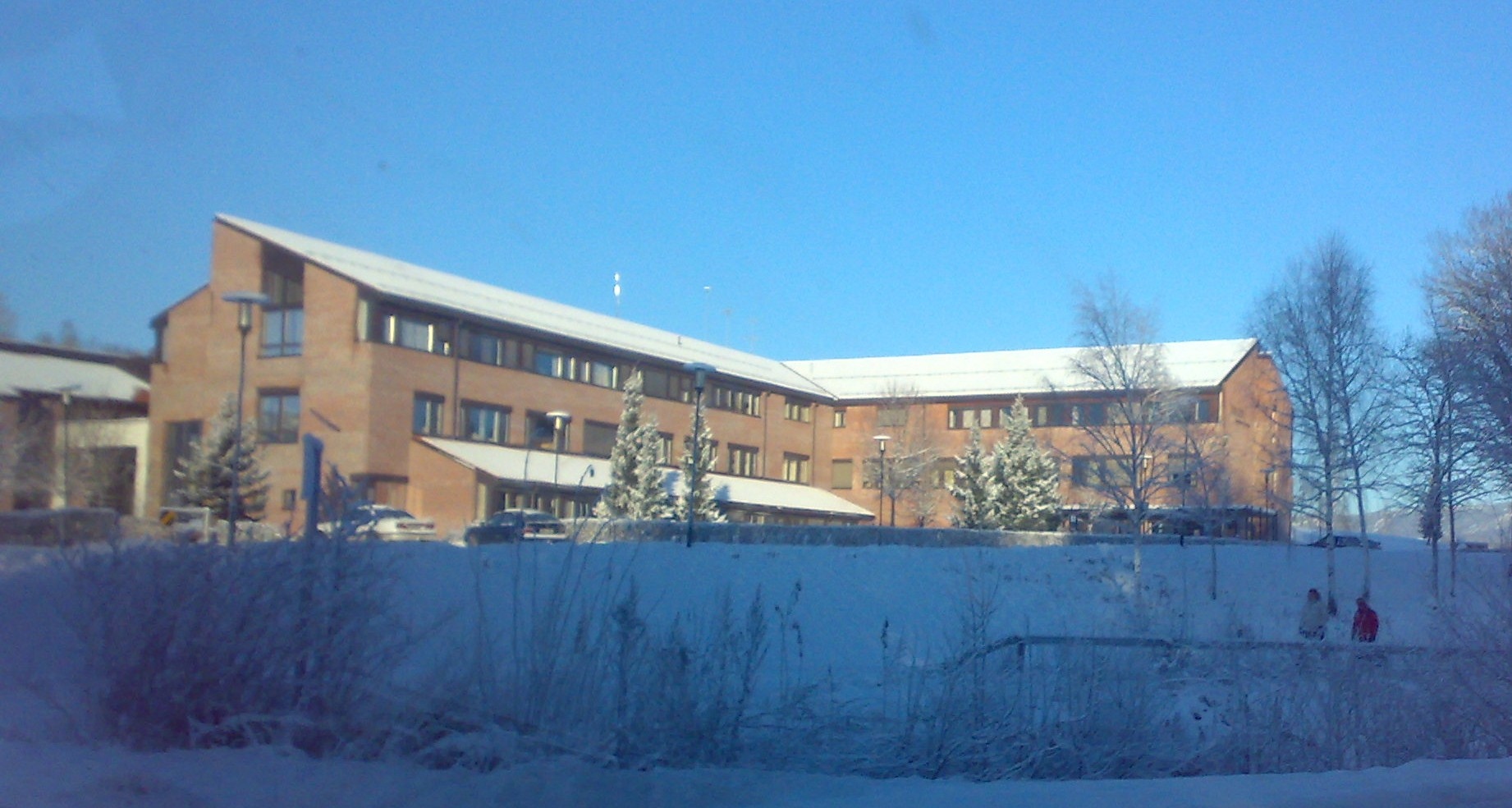
Campus Bø
