= Buskerud and Vestfold University College =

University college in Norway

- Høgskolen i Buskerud og Vestfold
- Type: University College
- Established: 1 January 2014
- Rector: Petter Aasen
- Administrative staff: 800
- Students: 8000
- Location: Drammen, Kongsberg, Hønefoss and Horten, Norway
- Website: www.hbv.no

Buskerud and Vestfold University College (Norwegian: Høgskolen i Buskerud og Vestfold, HBV) was a regional university college with campuses in Drammen, Kongsberg, Hønefoss and Horten in the counties of Vestfold and Buskerud, Norway.

It was created as a merger of Buskerud University College and Vestfold University College on 1 January 2014. It was the second-largest university college in Norway, measured in students, after Oslo and Akershus University College. From 2016 it merged with Telemark University College to form the University College of Southeast Norway.

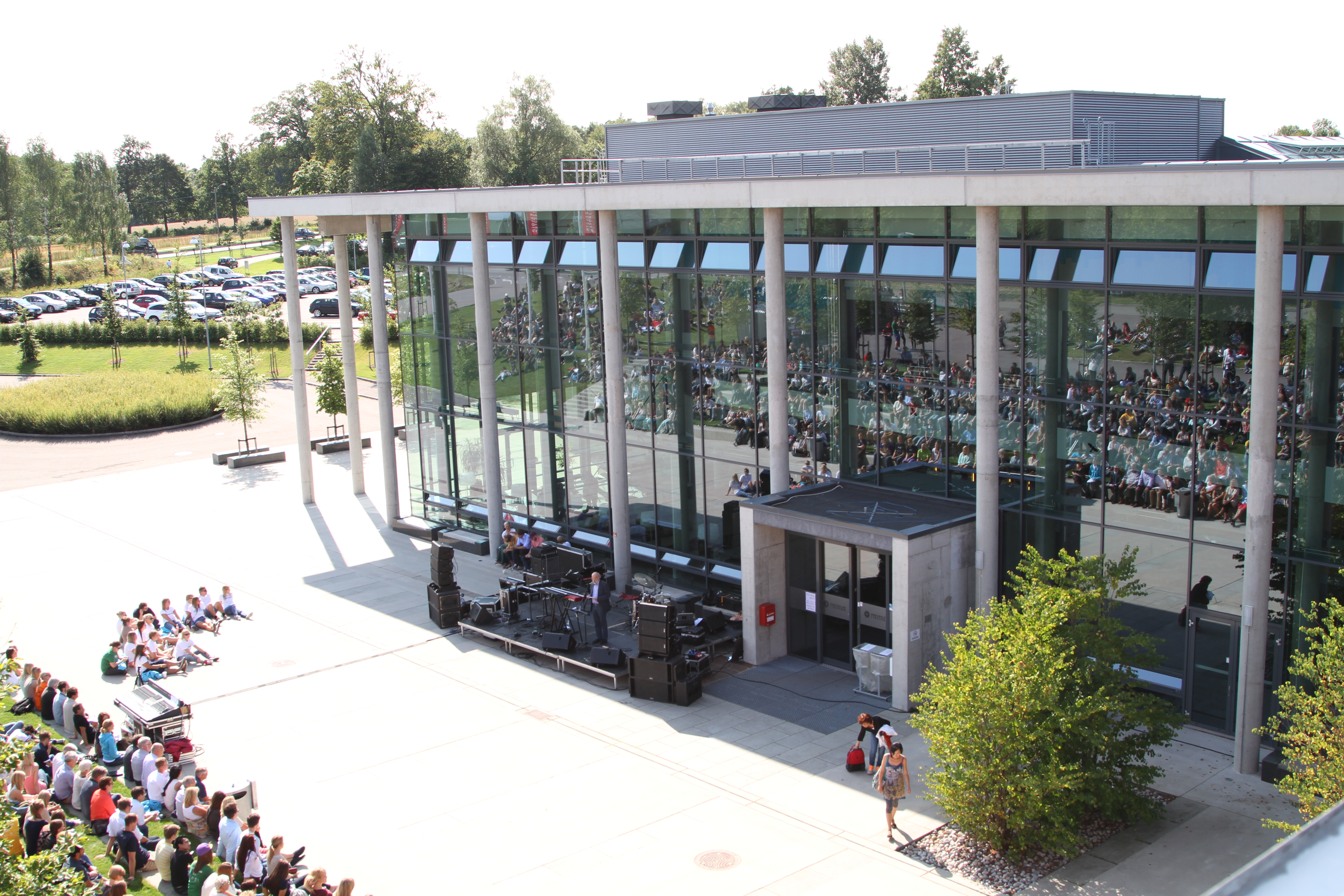
The Vestfold campus
