= Escuela Colombiana de Ingeniería =

Colombian School of Engineering
- Escuela Colombiana de Ingeniería
- Other names: ECI, La Escuela
- Motto: We build integral people with high scientific, technical and humanistic preparation, with an ethical compromise and a social solidarity spirit
- Type: Private
- Established: March 24, 1973
- Principal: Ing. Roberto Ríos Martínez
- Students: 4600
- Location: Ak. 45 No. 205-59 (Autopista Norte), Bogotá, Colombia; 4°46′57.69″N 74°2′32.12″W
- Campus: Urban, 70 acres (280,000 m^{2})
- Colors: Red & black
- Website: www.escuelaing.edu.co

The Escuela Colombiana de Ingeniería (Spanish for Colombian School of Engineering) Julio Garavito is a private engineering-based university. The school is located on a 70-acre (280,000 m^{2}) campus in a beautiful natural environment in the north part of Bogotá and has approximately 4,600 students in undergraduate and graduate programs. It includes laboratories, computer systems, one of the largest collections of engineering texts and journals in Colombia as well as international and national access to information via the internet.

== History ==
Taking its name from Colombian engineer and astronomer Julio Garavito, the school was founded on October 20, 1972, when the constitution act of the Colombian School of Engineering was signed.

The first established program was Civil Engineering, followed by Electric and Systems (Computer Science) Engineering. Later, the Industrial Engineering, Electronics Engineering and Economics programs were added.

In 2002 the Board of directors approved the creation of the Administration and International business program.

The school's structure has diversified ever since offering several additional courses and specializations.

The teachers and engineers who founded the school are:

- Luis Guillermo Aycardi Barrero
- Jorge Eduardo Estrada Villegas
- Manuel García López
- Gonzalo Jiménez Escobar
- Ernesto Obregón Torres
- Armando Palomino Infante
- Ricardo Quintana Sighinolfi
- Ricardo Rincón Hernández
- Alejandro Sandino Pardo
- Ignacio Umaña de Brigard
- Jairo Uribe Escamilla.

The foundation act was signed also by the following Colombian entrepreneurs, who contributed to the initiation and foundation of the school as benefactors:

- Jaime Michelsen Uribe
- Bernardo Pizano Brigard
- Javier Ramírez Soto
- Bernardo Saiz de Castro
- Luis Carlos Sarmiento Angulo
- Luis Alberto Serna Cortés.

In January 1973 the founders told about the school foundation and the start of academics labors with 88 students on March 20 of the same year.

== Academics ==
The Escuela Colombiana de Ingeniería offers, as of 2007, eight undergraduate programs. It has approximately 4,600 students in undergraduate and graduate programs

=== Undergraduate programs ===
- Civil Engineering
- Mechanical Engineering
- Electrical Engineering
- Electronic Engineering
- Systems Engineering (Computer Science/Software Engineering)
- Industrial Engineering
- Economy
- Administration (with emphasis in business and international finances)
- Mathematics

Academic programs are 10 semesters long with the exception of the Economics and the Administration programs which are 9 semesters.

=== Specializations (graduate programs) ===
- Project Management and Development
- Design, Construction and Conservation of Highways
- Structures
- Hydraulic Resources and the Environment
- Environmental Sanitation
- Economics for Engineers
- Telecommunications and e-business
