= Buskerud University College =

University college in Norway

Coordinates: 59°40′57.24″N 9°38′58.1″E

- Høgskolen i Buskerud
- Type: Public University college
- Active: 1 August 1994–1 January 2014
- Students: Approx. 4,500
- Location: Kongsberg, Drammen, and Hønefoss, Buskerud, Norway

Buskerud University College (Norwegian: Høgskolen i Buskerud or HiBu) was a university college established 1 August 1994 and situated in Viken county, Norway. It merged with Vestfold University College on 1 January 2014 to form Buskerud and Vestfold University College. This new school merged again on 1 January 2016 with Telemark University College into University College of Southeast Norway.

The University's campuses were located in three cities around Oslo: Kongsberg (technology and engineering), Drammen (political science, health science, teacher education, and design) and Hønefoss (business administration and management).

The institution had approximately 4500 students and 250 employees, and offered a broad range of bachelor and master programmes.

== Courses in English ==
Besides the courses in Norwegian, the following departments also offered courses taught in English:

- Engineering
- Political science
- Tourism
- Visual communication
- Norwegian language and culture

Master's degrees in English were offered in systems engineering, human rights and optometry/visual science.
