= Politécnico Grancolombiano =

The Politécnico Grancolombiano is a private university institution in Bogotá, Colombia. Its campus is located in the mountains of the city of Bogotá. It was founded on March 23, 1980 by banker and financier Jaime Michelsen Uribe, with support from Bancolombia and leading companies of the Grancolombiano Group. The current principal is Carlos Bernardo Carreño (2020)

== History ==
The university was founded in 1980 by Jaime Michelsen and his wife María Cristina Uribe Niño de Michelsen.

Since 2008, undergraduate programs at the Politécnico have entered a period of eight semesters, according to the vast majority of universities in developed countries, allowing for faster access to educational outreach.

The Institución Universitaria Politecnico Grancolombiano [(IUPG) University Institution Politecnico Grancolombiano ], became the acting president of educational networks "RENATA y RUMBO". These are university networks that are the home of institutions of higher education, considered first at the national level, and second at the district level. This certification was provided with approval from the Colombian Ministry of Education in 2007.

== Campus ==
The institution has a main office located in the city of Bogotá, in the neighborhood of Chapinero in an area adjacent to the Castle district. The campus is located in the mountains among a forest of eucalyptus, which the institution has helped to reforest since the year 2011. This allows the college to have a view of the city of Bogotá.

In 2015 a new Campus in the city of Medellín was launched in the neighborhood Los Colores in the west side of the city.

== Ilumino Network ==
The Politécnico Grancolombiano is part of Ilumino Network, University System of the Américas, comprising nine universities in Argentina, Brazil, Chile, Colombia, Costa Rica, Guatemala, Panama and Paraguay. This association of higher education institutions forms a community of 250,000 students and graduates, making it the largest academic community in Latin America.
