= Dutch Institute of Systems and Control =

The Dutch Institute of Systems and Control is an interuniversity institute and graduate school that unites nine university departments in the Netherlands active in systems and control theory and engineering. The graduate school offers courses covering a wide range of topics from mathematical system theory to control engineering. DISC provides a program in systems and control offered to PhD students of the participating departments, such as graduate courses, summer school and network events. The Institute also unites all academic research in the Netherlands in the field of systems and control. Examples of knowledge application are developing energy-efficient greenhouses, designing cars that drive by wire, autonomously walking or flying robots, and operational strategies in process industry.
