= Jaime Michelsen Uribe =

Colombian lawyer and banker, founder of Grupo Grancolombiano

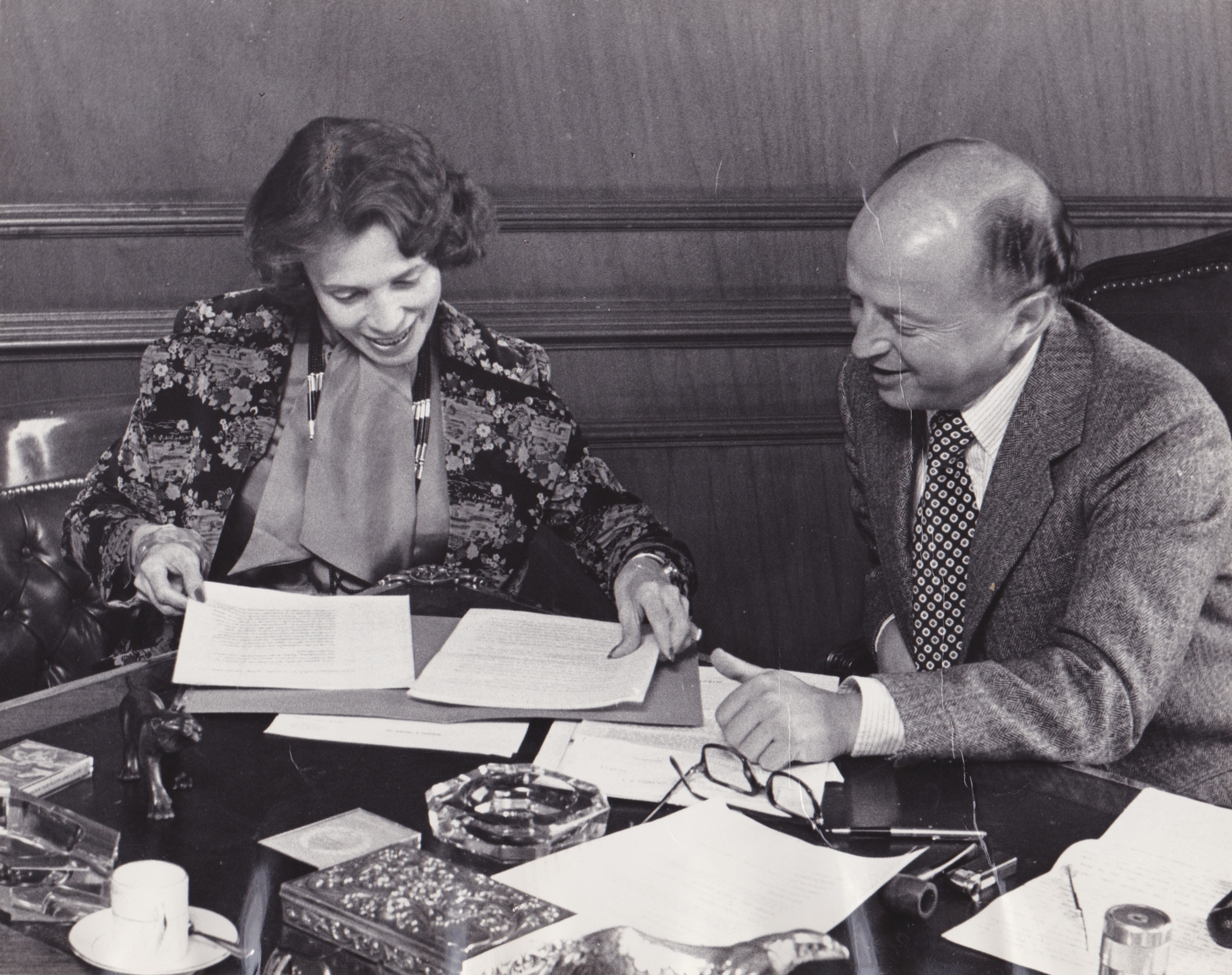
- Born: March 25, 1930; Bogotá, Colombia
- Died: July 4, 1998; Bogotá, Colombia
- Occupations: Banker, businessman
- Years active: 1945 - 1998
- Spouse: María Cristina Niño Reyes (1954-1998)
- Parent(s): Ernesto Michelsen Mantilla; María Uribe Portocarrero

Jaime Michelsen Uribe (Bogotá, March 25, 1930 - Ibid., July 4, 1998) was a Colombian banker and businessman.

He was one of the most successful businessmen in Colombia, as owner of the largest economic conglomerate in the country, the Grancolombiano Group, to which important companies in the country belonged. As head of the conglomerate, Michelsen was involved in one of the largest corruption scandals in the history of the Colombian stock market.

== Biography ==
He was the son of banker Ernesto Michelsen Mantilla, director of the Banco Central Hipotecario, and his wife María Uribe Portocarrero. He studied law, and in 1945 he joined the National Insurance Company of Colombia, where he worked and acquired experience and capital.

=== Business activity ===
Michelsen managed to amass a small fortune, and in 1959, he created the Grancolombiana Credit Insurance Company, S.A. which was the first company of his future conglomerate He also acquired Banco de Colombia from its owners, a key company in his business success.

One of his partners was businessman Héctor Mario Barrero, whom he helped financially and supported in two of his business crises. Michelsen also took control of some of Barrero's companies, which allowed him to grow his number of companies.

==== Grancolombiano Group ====
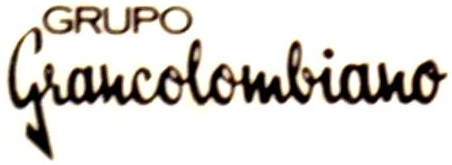
Conglomerate logo

He founded the most important business system in Colombia, the Grancolombiano Group, created on September 14, 1972, due to the appearance of the Housing Savings Corporations, during the government of President Misael Pastrana. The conglomerate's logo was an eagle with outstretched wings.

In 1974, Michelsen founded the National Association of Financial Institutions (ANIF), which was chaired by the liberal politician Ernesto Samper.

Thanks to the capital he acquired, Michelsen became the owner of several important companies in the country, and by 1983, he was the owner of 20% of the Colombian stock market, and of around 64 companies, including Cine Colombia, the National Chocolate Company, the Bank of Colombia, the higher education institution Politécnico Grancolombiano, among other investments.

=== Stock market scandal ===
In 1982 a media scandal broke out, led by the newspaper El Espectador, in which he reported that members of the group's board of directors (including several members of the López and Michelsen families) were making loans to themselves, This practice was prohibited under Colombian law. In addition, speculative operations were carried out using false properties as collateral, so clients were left without backing for their savings, and shareholders ran the risk of losing their contributions. The Michelsens allegedly took advantage of a state of emergency declared by the government to carry out their illicit activities.

In response to the accusations, the group withdrew advertising from the paper and campaigned for all its partners not to take out advertisements with the newspaper, which greatly damaged the finances of the newspaper, El Espectador. Despite the blow, Guillermo Cano, the newspaper's director, supported his journalists' investigations into the Grancolombiano case. In 1983, the Betancur government intervened in the scandal, taking over the Banco de Colombia. Likewise, the National Securities Commission was created to confront the crisis.

Faced with this situation, Michelsen Uribe fled to Miami on December 31 of that year, after the intention to prosecute him became public. The financial collapse is believed to have amounted to 500 million pesos at the time.

The group was dismantled during 1983 and 1984. The government liquidated other companies in the conglomerate, to secure the obligations it had incurred over the years. However, the strongest company resulting from the group's collapse was Banco de Colombia, which was renamed Bancolombia, today one of the most important business entities in the country. On January 9, 1984, an arrest warrant was issued against him. He lived in Miami for a while and then moved to Panama, where he continued his business. He then returned to Colombia in 1988. Upon his arrival he was captured, and after regaining his conditional freedom, he escaped back to Panama. He only spent two years in prison, as his lawyers were able to prove that due to his health and age it was impossible for him to serve a longer sentence.

=== Later years and death ===
Upon his return to Panama, Michelsen arrived sick and was admitted several times to the Country Clinic in Bogotá, which worsened his health until his death. He died on July 4, 1998, at the age of 68, in his residence in the Quinta Camacho neighbourhood in northern Bogotá. His death came after four years of illness.

His funeral was held in the Chapel of Gimnasio Moderno, on July 5 and was buried in the Central Cemetery of Bogotá, in the family crypt.

== Family ==
He belonged to the Michelsen family, which, due to family, political and business connections, was one of the most important in Colombia in the last century. However, his family also enjoyed prestige on its own merit. His father was the important banker Ernesto Michelsen Mantilla, who was a descendant of the Danish businessman Karl Michelsen Koppel, of Jewish descent.

He was the grandfather of the lawyer and politician Cristina Plazas Michelsen, High Advisor for Women's Equality in the government Santos, Bogotá councilor, presidential secretary of Santos and former director of the ICBF

Alfonso López's son, Felipe López Caballero, tried to get Michelsen Uribe to invest in his journalistic project, revista Semana, recently acquired by him from Alberto Lleras Camargo. However, Michelsen declined the offer.

=== Camila Michelsen's kidnapping ===
His daughter Camila Michelsen Niño, a young woman at the time of the events, She was kidnapped by the April 19 Movement (M-19) on September 24, 1985. It was plagiarized in the Politécnico Grancolombiano where the captors entered, who threatened the girl's teacher. Among the motives for the kidnapping, the guerrilla claimed responsibility for Michelsen's financial crisis that was hitting the country in those years. In fact, the M-19 demanded that Michelsen publicly account for the fate of the money of those affected in his companies in the country's newspapers.

After a long negotiation, and the payment of his ransom of 500 thousand dollars, Camila was released on July 31, 1987. However, her father, who was a fugitive in Panama, reported to the Colombian press that despite the ransom payment, the young woman was detained on two more occasions.

== Bibliography ==
- Dávila, C. (2003). Empresas y empresarios en la historia de Colombia: siglos XIX-XX.
- Donadio, A. ¿Por qué cayó Jaime Michelsen?. Ancora Editores. ISBN 978-84-89209-42-8.
- Gómez Caballero, R. (1979). !!Jaimito Guanábana Michelsen Uribe--yo quiero la verdad!!.
- Rincón, F. (1989). Michelsen, el poder de la desgracia. Aquí y Ahora Editores.
- Rodríguez, H.M. (1989). El Águila. ISBN 978-84-89209-42-8.
- Uribe Escobar, J. El Valor de los talentos.
