= Sanna Sarromaa =

Finnish sociologist

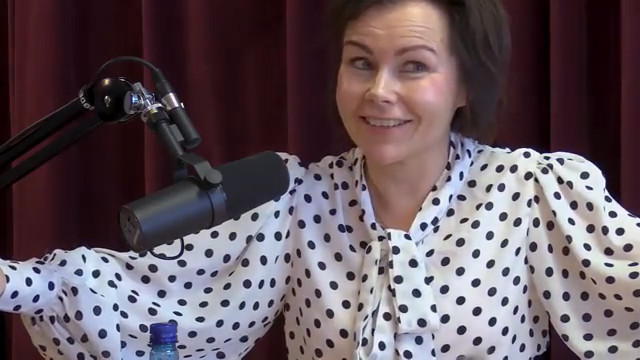
- Sanna Sarromaa at Wolfgang Wee in 2024
- Born: 10 October 1979 (age 46); Lahtis
- Education: Karlstad University

Sanna Sarromaa (born 1979) is a Finnish journalist, history lecturer, sociologist and author. She lives in Norway and is known for her participation in the public debate about Norwegian society through columns and books.

== Life and work ==
Sarromaa came to Norway as an exchange student just after the turn of the millennium and moved to Lillehammer in 2002. She received her doctorate in sociology with a focus on gender research from Karlstad University in 2011. She was employed at Lillehammer University College as a lecturer (2004–2006), research fellow (2006–2010) and postdoctoral fellow (2012–2014). From 2018 to 2024 she worked as a lecturer at upper secondary school and in lower secondary school.

She has been a local politician for the Conservative Party and later the Liberal Party in Oppland. She has particularly made a name for herself for having written many columns in Gudbrandsdølen Dagningen and in VG where she has criticized what she perceives as laziness in the workplace and Norwegian culture of mediocrity, low learning pressure in school, complaint culture and distrust of professional assessments, as well as poor spelling and Norwegian language policy. In 2016 she published Norske tabuer, a sarcastic-humorous and partly autobiographical book on the same themes as her previous newspaper columns.

In 2019, she published The Divorce Book, which was based on her own divorce experience, interviews with 40 divorced women and men, as well as interviews on the topic with lawyers, therapists, and psychologists.

In 2024, she joined Minerva as a journalist.

== Authorship ==
- Norske tabuer: Om likhetens tyranni, språk som religion og hellige mødre. Spartacus 2016 ISBN 9788243009998
- Skilsmisseboken: En overlevelsesguide. Res Publica 2019 ISBN 9788282260930
- Hvorfor gikk jeg ikke? Om kjærlighet og psykisk vold. Res Publica 2023.
