= Vestfold University College =

University college in Vestfold og Telemark, Norway

Coordinates: 59°22′07″N 10°26′30″E

- Høgskolen i Vestfold
- Type: State university college
- Established: 1994
- Rector: Petter Aasen (2007-)
- Students: 4,000
- Location: Horten, Norway
- Website: www.hive.no

Vestfold University College (Norwegian: Høgskolen i Vestfold, abbreviated as HiVe) was a university college in the county of Vestfold, Norway. The university college's campuses were formerly located in Borre and Eik. From 2010 the whole university college was co-located at Campus Bakkenteigen in Horten. It was established 1 August 1994 by the merger of three previous university colleges (Eik Normal School, Vestfold College Center, and Vestfold Nursing College), and has approximately 4,000 students and 450 employees. The university college has four faculties: Humanities and Education, Health Sciences, Business and Social Sciences, and Technology and Maritime Sciences. The college merged with Buskerud University College on 1 January 2014 to create Buskerud and Vestfold University College.

== Study programmes in English ==
As of 2007, one 30 ECTS course is offered in English, "A Norwegian Cultural Journey". From 2010 a PhD program in applied micro- and nanosystem technologies is offered in English.
