= Telemark University College =

Former university college in Telemark, Norway (1994–2015)

Coordinates: 59.1388°N 9.6724°E

Telemark University College (TUC, Norwegian: Høgskolen i Telemark, HiT) was, until its merger, the fourth largest university college in Norway. The University College had about 7000 students, split between four locations in Bø, Notodden, Porsgrunn, Rauland and Drammen.

== Hierarchy ==
The university college was organised into four faculties: The Faculty of Arts and Sciences, The Faculty of Arts, Folk Culture and Teacher Education, The Faculty of Health and Social Studies and The Faculty of Technology.

More than 140 courses of study were offered within the fields of Engineering, Nursing, Teaching, Culture, Folk Culture, Folk Music, Environmental and health studies, Sports and physical education, Outdoor life, Economics, Computer Science and Languages.

Studies were offered at bachelor's and master's degree-level, in addition to professional writer's education. They furthermore offered two PhD programmes. There were also several one–year programmes available. Most studies were taught in Norwegian, but some programmes were taught in English, mainly master's degrees. Telemark University College used the European Credit Transfer and Accumulation System

The last rector was Kristian Bogen. In 2016 it merged with Buskerud and Vestfold University College to form the University College of Southeast Norway.
