= List of systems engineers =

This is a list of notable systems engineers, people who were trained in or practice systems engineering, and made notable contributions to this field in theory or practice.

== A ==
- James S. Albus (1935–2011), American engineer, founder of NIST Intelligent Systems Division
- Genrich Altshuller (1926–1998), Russian engineer; inventor of TRIZ, Theory of Inventive Problem Solving
- Arnaldo Maria Angelini (1909–1999), Italian engineer; Professor of Electrotechnics at the Sapienza University of Rome
- Fred Ascani (1917–2010), American Major General, "father of systems engineering at Wright Field"

== B ==
- Dave Bennett (born 1963)
- Benjamin Blanchard (1929–2019), Virginia Polytechnic Institute; SE educator; author of texts on systems engineering and related disciplines
- Wernher von Braun (1912–1977), chief architect of the Saturn V launch vehicle

== C ==
- Peter Checkland (born 1930), British management scientist and emeritus professor of Systems at Lancaster University; developer of soft systems methodology (SSM), a methodology based on a way of systems thinking
- Boris Chertok (1912–2011), Rocket Space Corporation "Energy", Moscow, Russia; 2004 Simon Ramo Medal winner for significant contributions to systems engineering and technical leadership of control systems design for the orbiting space station Mir
- Harold Chestnut (1918–2001), American electrical engineer and systems engineer; first president of the International Federation of Automatic Control (IFAC)
- John R. Clymer (born 1942), researcher, practitioner, and teacher in the field of systems engineering; INCOSE Fellow; expert in conceiving, engineering, and demonstrating computeraided design tools for context-sensitive, self-adaptive systems
- Mary (Missy) Cummings (born c. 1966), Associate Professor of Aeronautics and Astronautics at the Massachusetts Institute of Technology; one of the first female fighter pilots in the U.S. Navy

== F ==
- Wolt Fabrycky (born 1932), Virginia Polytechnic Institute; SE educator; author of texts on systems engineering and related disciplines
- Irmgard Flügge-Lotz (1903–1974), Stanford University, developed discontinuous automatic control and laid the foundation for automatic on-off aircraft control in jets
- Kevin Forsberg (born 1934)
- Jacque Fresco (1916–2017), project director at The Venus Project

== G ==
- Tom Gilb (born 1940), American systems engineer; inventor of Planguage and Evolutionary Project Management
- Harry H. Goode (1909–1960), American computer engineer and systems engineer; professor at University of Michigan; until his death he was president of the National Joint Computer Committee (NJCC); with Robert Engel Machol, he wrote the famous System Engineering Handbook
- William Gosling (born c. 1930), British electrical engineer, Emeritus Professor of Electrical Engineering at the University of Bath, and pioneer of system design in electrical engineering

== H ==
- Arthur David Hall III (1925–2006), American electrical engineer; worked at Bell Labs; one of the founders of the IEEE; was among the first general systems theorists; wrote A Methodology of Systems Engineering from 1962
- David Heebner, consultant; recipient of 2003 Simon Ramo Medal for leadership in introducing towed line array sonar systems for long range detection of submarines
- Derek Hitchins (born 1935), British systems engineer; professor in engineering management, in command & control and in systems science at the Cranfield University, Bedfordshire, England
- Peggy Hodges OBE FRAeS FIMA (1921–2008), British engineer who worked on guided missile technology at GEC Marconi.

== I ==
- Junichi Iijima (born 1954), Japanese computer scientist; professor of the Department of Industrial Management and Engineering at the Tokyo Institute of Technology

== J ==
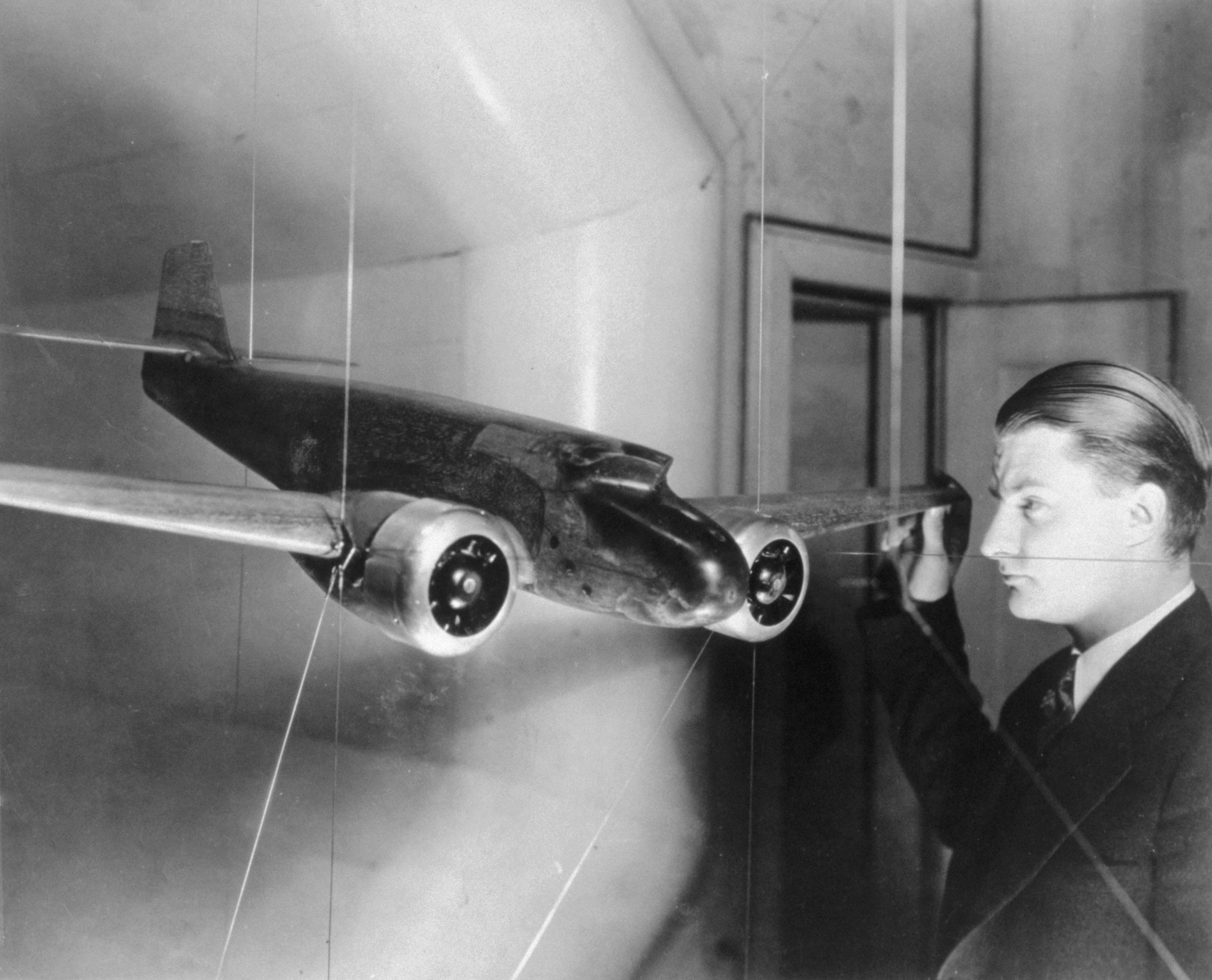
Clarence Johnson

- Gwilym Jenkins (1933–1982), British statistician and systems engineer; professor of Systems Engineering at Lancaster University; best known for the Box–Jenkins methodology for fitting time series models
- Clarence "Kelly" Johnson (1910–1990), American aircraft engineer and aeronautical innovator; worked for Lockheed for more than four decades, playing a leading role in the design of over 40 aircraft, and acquiring a reputation as one of the most talented and prolific aircraft design engineers of the 20th century

== K ==
- Rudolf Emil Kálmán (1930–2016), American-Hungarian mathematical system theorist; an electrical engineer by training
- George Klir (1932–2016), Czech-American computer scientist and professor of systems sciences at the Center for Intelligent Systems at the Binghamton University in New York; author of several texts on systems, including Architecture of Systems Problem Solving
- Sergei Pavlovich Korolev (1907–1966), Russian rocket and space systems designer beating the Americans during the Cold War times "space race" by Sputnik and putting the first man in space (Gagarin); his rocket and capsule designs are in principle still in use for supplying the International Space Station (Proton, Soyuz)
- Kurt Kosanke (born c. 1945), German engineer, retired IBM manager, director of the AMICE Consortium and consultant; known for his work in the field of enterprise engineering, enterprise integration and CIMOSA

== L ==
- Robert J. Lano, systems engineer at TRW corporation; originator of the N^{2} chart
- Donald J. Leonard (born 1933), American engineer, AT&T executive, received the 1996 IEEE Simon Ramo Medal
- Donald H. Liles (born c. 1948), American systems engineer; Emeritus Professor at the University of Texas at Arlington

== M ==
- Robert Engel Machol (1917–1998), early American systems engineer
- Richard J. Mayer (born 1952), American engineer, developer of IDEF family of modeling languages
- John S. Mayo (born 1930), American engineer; seventh president of Bell Labs
- Harold Mooz (born c. 1932), INCOSE systems engineering pioneer (2001); author of Visualizing Project Management (1996) and Communicating Project Management (2003); contributing author to The Wiley Guide to Managing Projects (2004); recipient of the CIA Seal Medallion
- Philip M'Pherson (1927–2016), British systems engineer; founder of the Department of Systems Science at City University
- George Mueller (1918–2015), American engineer; associate administrator of NASA during Apollo Program; pioneer of the "all-up" testing concept

== N ==
- James G. Nell (born 1938), American engineer; principal investigator of the Manufacturing Enterprise Integration Project at the National Institute of Standards and Technology (NIST); known for his work on enterprise integration

== O ==
- Hermann Oberth (1894–1989), Romanian/German space pioneer; derived basic rocket equations and described in principle all features of rockets and space stations still valid today; author of Die Rakete zu den Planetenraeumen (1923) and Wege zur Raumschiffahrt (1929); mentor of Wernher von Braun
- Tuncer Őren (born c. 1935), Turkish/Canadian systems engineer; professor emeritus of Computer Science at the School of Information Technology and Engineering (SITE) of the University of Ottawa

== P ==
- Bradford Parkinson (born 1935), American professor of Aeronautics and Astronautics at the Stanford University; recipient of the Simon Ramo Medal for leading the concept development of GPS
- Samuel C. Phillips (1921–1990), USAF general; Director of NASA's Apollo Manned Lunar Landing Program

== R ==
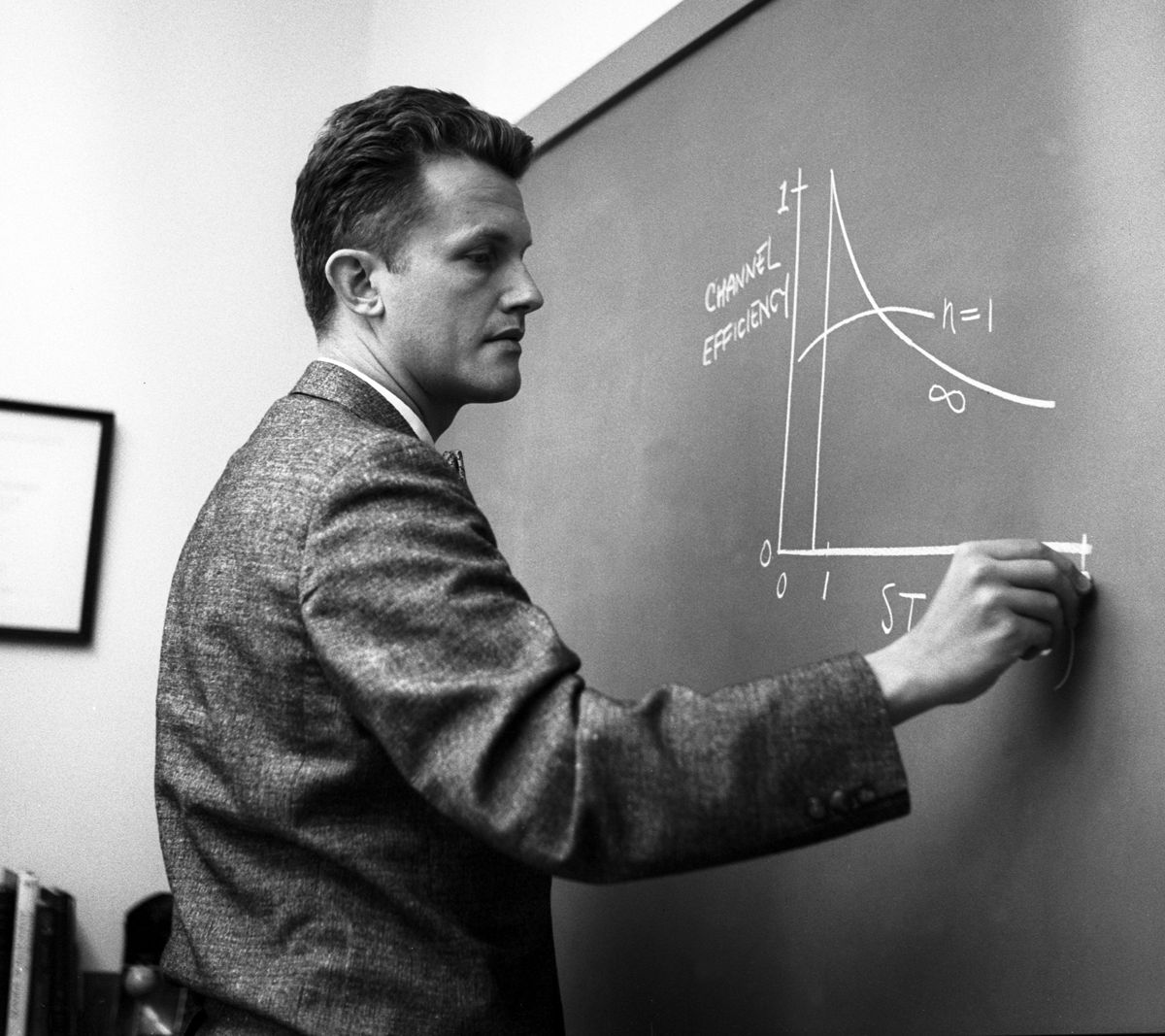
Eberhardt Rechtin

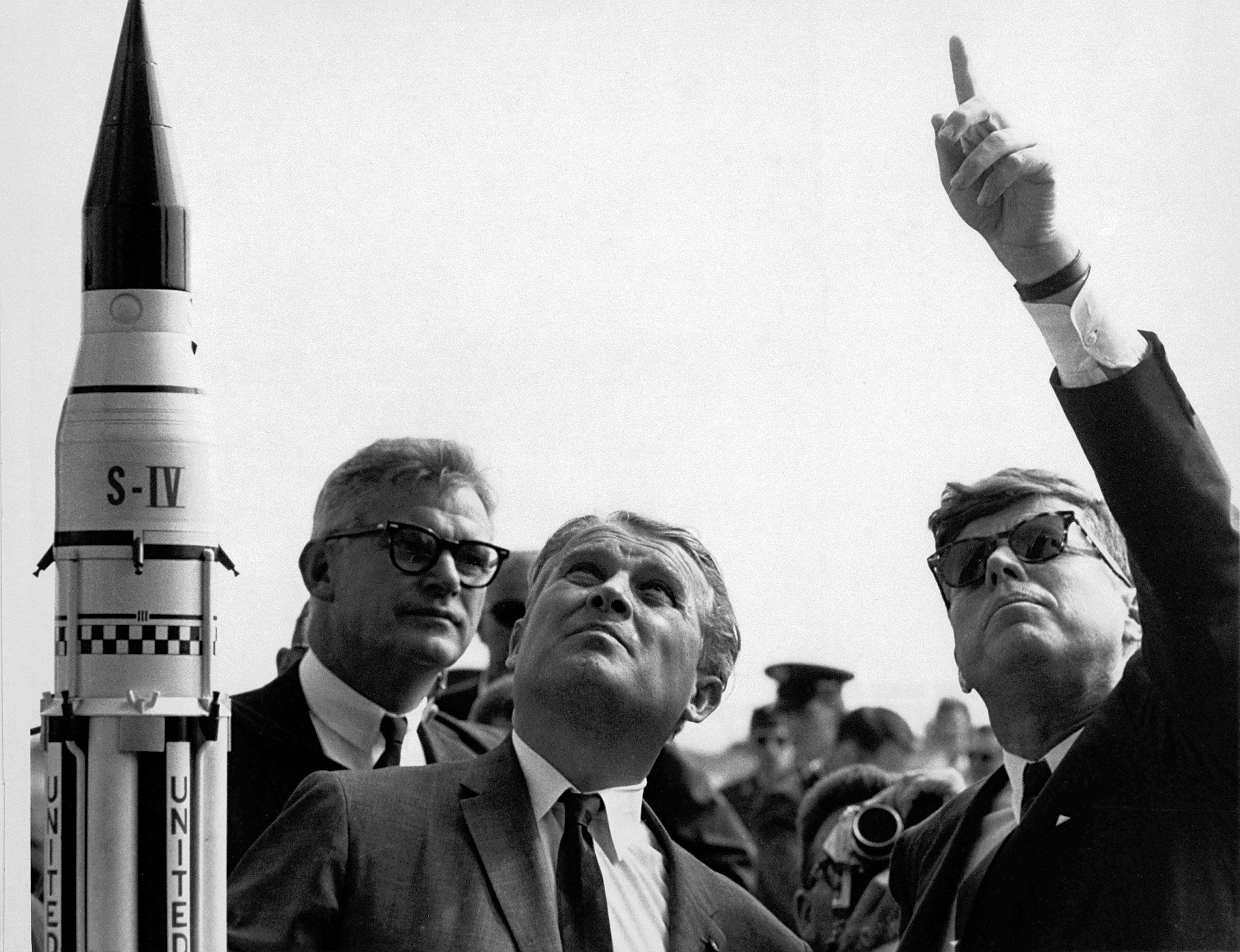
Seamans, Von Braun and Kennedy at Cape Canaveral

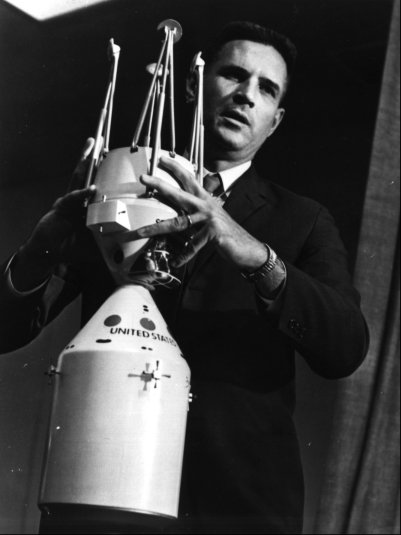
Joseph Francis Shea

- Simon Ramo (1913–2016), American physicist, engineer, and business leader; led development of microwave and missile technology; sometimes known as the "father of the ICBM"
- Eberhardt Rechtin (1926–2006), American systems engineer and respected authority in aerospace systems and systems architecture
- Allen B. Rosenstein (1920–2018), American systems engineer and Professor of Systems Engineering at the University of California at Los Angeles

== S ==
- Andrew P. Sage (1933–2014), School of Information Technology and Engineering, George Mason University; recipient of the 2000 Simon Ramo Medal for outstanding contributions to the field of systems engineering; series editor of a textbook series on systems engineering and management for John Wiley & Son
- Robert Seamans (1918–2008), NASA Deputy Administrator and MIT professor
- Joseph Francis Shea (1925–1999), systems engineer on the Titan I ballistic missile; head of the Apollo Spacecraft Program Office
- Nikolai Sheremetevsky, Advisor to Director, All Russia Institute for Electromechanics; recipient of the 2004 Simon Ramo Medal for significant contributions to systems engineering and technical leadership of control systems design for the orbiting space station Mir
- Neil Siegel (born 1954), Vice-President and Chief Engineer of the Northrop Grumman Corporation; lead systems engineer for many US Army systems; member of the US National Academy of Engineering; Fellow of the IEEE; recipient of the Simon Ramo Medal in 2011 for his work on the US Army's digital battlefield system
- William W. Simmons (born 1932), American physicist and development of electro-optical devices
- Edward Sussengeth (1932–2015), American engineer, developer of APL programming language and multiple IBM computer systems
- Alistair Sutcliffe (born 1951), British engineer; professor at University of Manchester

== T ==
- Arnold Tustin (1899–1994), British engineer; Professor of Engineering at the University of Birmingham and at Imperial College London; made important contributions to the development of control engineering and its application to electrical machines

== W ==
- John N. Warfield (1925–2009), American electrical engineering and systems scientist; member of the Academic Committee of the International Encyclopedia of Systems and Cybernetics
- Kevin Warwick (born 1954), Deputy Vice-Chancellor (Research) at Coventry University; previously Professor of Cybernetics at the University of Reading; best known for his implant research linking humans and technology as a system
- Brian Wilson (born 1933), British systems scientist and honorary professor at Cardiff University; known for his development of soft systems methodology (SSM) and enterprise modelling
- A. Wayne Wymore (1927–2011), American mathematician and systems engineer; founder and first Chairman of Systems and Industrial Engineering (SIE) Department at the University of Arizona; one of the first Fellows of International Council on Systems Engineering (INCOSE)

== See also ==
- Lists of engineers – for lists of engineers from other disciplines
- List of systems scientists
- People in systems and control
- List of systems engineering at universities
- INCOSE Pioneer Award
