= INCOSE Pioneer Award =

- Awarded for: recognition of "outstanding pioneer-applications of Systems Engineering in the development of successful products or services of benefit to society."
- Presented by: INCOSE
- First award: 1997
- Website: INCOSE Pioneer Award, (criteria)

INCOSE Pioneer Award is an annual prize for people who have made significant pioneering contributions to the field of systems engineering given by the INCOSE (International Council on Systems Engineering) since 1997.

== Winners ==
Source: INCOSE

- 1997: Simon Ramo
- 1998: Derek Hitchins
- 1999: Eberhardt Rechtin
- 2000: Wolt Fabrycky, Benjamin S. Blanchard
- 2001: Harold Mooz, Kevin Forsberg
- 2002: Andrew Sage
- 2003: A. Wayne Wymore
- 2006: Philip M'Pherson
- 2007: John N. Warfield
- 2008: Peter Checkland
- 2009: Lui Pao Chuen
- 2010: Julian M. Goldman
- 2011: Azad Madni, Xue-Shen Qian
- 2012: Jung Uck Seo
- 2015: Norm Augustine
- 2016: Harold W. Lawson
- 2017: Hans Mark
- 2018: Suresh B. N.
- 2019: Barry Boehm
- 2020: Odd A. Asbjornsen and Arthur B. Pyster

== See also ==
- List of engineering awards
- List of systems engineers
- IEEE Simon Ramo Medal
