= Agency Seal Medal =

U.S. Central Intelligence Agency award

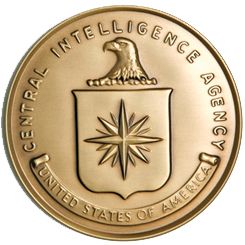
- Awarded for: "Non-Agency personnel, to include U.S. Government employees and private citizens who have made significant contributions to the Agency’s intelligence efforts."
- Country: United States of America
- Presented by: Central Intelligence Agency
- Eligibility: Non-Agency personnel, including U.S. Government employees and private citizens

Precedence
- Next (higher): Hostile Action Service Medal
- Next (lower): Gold Retirement Medallion

The Agency Seal Medal (formerly Medallion) is awarded by the Central Intelligence Agency to non-Agency personnel, including U.S. Government employees and private citizens, who have made significant contributions to the Agency's intelligence efforts.

== Known or indicated recipients ==
Since recipients of this award are not all made public, it is not possible to verify with certainty whether a person has, or has not, received this award. The following individuals list the Agency Seal Medal (or Medallion) in their public biographies and have verifiable backgrounds consistent with that claim.

- Vincent Melzac (1982)
- Robert R. Simmons (1985)
- Mary C. Lawton (1986)
- Victoria Toensing (1986)
- Richards J. Heuer Jr. (1987)
- William V. Trollinger (1987)
- Dan McKinnon (1989)
- RDML David M. Goebel (1991) (START I)
- Colonel Jesse Johnson (Commander SOCCENT, Gulf War - 1991)
- Jeannie Rousseau (Vicomtesse de Clarens) (1993)
- Gordon J. F. MacDonald (1994)
- William H. Press (1994)
- Bruce Hoffman (1994)
- Judge Joyce Hens Green (1995)
- Naval Surface Warfare Center Technical Support Group (1995)
- Lt. General William Quinn (1997)
- L. Britt Snider (1997)
- Robert Chesnut (1997)
- Veryl Goodnight (2000)
- Siddhi Savetsila (2000), with 4 other Free Thai veterans
- Carl Nick Sudano (2001)
- Joseph Shannon (2001)
- Victor A. DeMarines (2001)
- Stephen A. Cheney (2002)
- Marine Air Control Squadron 2 (2004)
- Lt. Colonel Rick Francona (2006)
- Gilman Louie (2006)
- MSgt David W. Hamlet (2007)
- Senator Pat Roberts (2007)
- U.S. Rep. Jane Harman (2007)
- Frances Fragos Townsend (2007)
- U.S. Rep. Heather Wilson (2008)
- Senator John Warner (2009)
- U.S. Rep. Peter Hoekstra (2010)
- Chad W. Moore (2012)
- Gerald Hackett (2017)
- Ambassador Harry B. Harris Jr. (2013)

Year of award unknown (listed alphabetically):

- Oswald LeWinter
- Paul W. Butler
- Michael T. Dougherty
- Hal Mooz and Kevin Forsberg
- Senator Wyche Fowler, Jr.
- Maj. General Robert A. Harding
- Col. Stuart A. Herrington
- Gen. Patrick M. Hughes
- Judge Kenneth M. Karas
- Maj. General Jack Leide
- LTG Michael Flynn
- Harriet Miers
- Senator Daniel Patrick Moynihan
- Benjamin A. Powell
- Erik Prince
- David W. Szady
- Mary Jo White
- Joseph Yorio
- Craig Rychlicki (2002)
- Walter Patrick Lang

== See also ==
- Awards and decorations of the United States government
