= General Harding =

General Harding may refer to:

- Abner C. Harding (1807–1874), Illinois Volunteer Infantry brigadier general in the American Civil War
- Edwin F. Harding (1886–1970), U.S. Army major general
- Francis Pym Harding (1821–1875), British Army general
- George Harding (British Army officer) (1788–1860), British Army lieutenant general
- John Harding, 1st Baron Harding of Petherton (1896–1989), British Army
- Reginald Harding (1905–1981), British Army major general
- Richard C. Harding (fl. 1970s–2010s), U.S. Air Force lieutenant general
- Robert Harding (fl. 2000s–2010s), U.S. Army major general
- William Giles Harding (1808–1886), Confederate States Army brigadier general

== See also ==
- Arthur Edward Hardinge (1828–1892), British Army general
- Henry Hardinge, 1st Viscount Hardinge (1785–1856), British Army general
- John J. Hardin (1810–1847), Illinois Militia major general
- Martin Davis Hardin (1837–1923), Union Army brigadier general
