= Harold Mooz =

American business consultant

- Born: c. 1932 (age 93–94); United States
- Other names: Hal Mooz
- Education: Stevens Institute of Technology
- Occupations: Business consultant, systems engineer
- Known for: Integration of system engineering and project management

Harold (Hal) Mooz (born ca. 1932) is an American systems engineer, business consultant and founder and CEO of The Center for Systems Management, Inc., awarded the INCOSE Pioneer Award in 2001.

== Early life and education ==
Mooz received his ME in Mechanical Engineering in 1954 from the Stevens Institute of Technology.

== Career ==
After graduation he worked in industry for 22 years as aerospace chief systems engineer and as project manager. In 1981 he started as an independent business consultant, and in 1989 founded the management training and consulting company The Center for Systems Management, Inc. He is a member of the Project Management Institute and of INCOSE.

== Recognition ==
With Kevin Forsberg Mooz is awarded both the CIA Agency Seal Medallion and in 2001 the INCOSE Pioneer Award acknowledging "Working as a team with Kevin Forsberg, he has pioneered and tirelessly promoted the concept of the integration of system engineering and project management into a single seamless process. In addition to his own work on complex development projects, he has taught thousands of professionals around the globe, both through tutorials and presentations and through his book, written with Dr.Forsberg, “Visualizing Project Management”."

== Publications ==
Mooz has authored and co-authored over 60 publications on systems engineering and project management. A selection:

- Forsberg, Kevin, Hal Mooz, and Howard Cotterman. Visualizing Project Management: a model for business and technical success. John Wiley and Sons, Three Editions 1995, 2000, 2005.
- Mooz, Hal, Kevin Forsberg, and Howard Cotterman. Communicating Project Management: The Integrated Vocabulary of Project Management and Systems Engineering. John Wiley and Sons, 2003.
- Mooz, Hal. Make Up Your Mind: A Decision Making Guide To Thinking Clearly and Choosing Wisely. John Wiley and Sons, 2012.

Articles, a selection:

- Forsberg, Kevin, and Harold Mooz. "The relationship of system engineering to the project cycle." Proceedings of the First Annual Symposium of National Council on System Engineering. October 1991: 57–65.
- Forsberg, Kevin, and Harold Mooz. "System engineering overview." Software Requirements Engineering (1997): 44-72.
- Forsberg, Kevin, and Harold Mooz. "System engineering for faster, cheaper, better." 1999 Ninth annual international symposium (INCOSE), Brighton, England. 1999.
- Mooz, Harold, and Kevin Forsberg. "The dual vee—illuminating the management of complexity." Proc 16th Annu Int Symp INCOSE, Orlando, FL. 2006.
