= John R. Clymer =

American systems engineer (born 1941)

- Born: December 9, 1941; Marion, Iowa, USA
- Occupation: Systems engineering advisor/fellow

John R. Clymer (born 1941) is an American systems engineer, and professor of electrical engineering and systems engineering at California State University, Fullerton (CSUF).

== Biography ==
Clymer received his B.S.E.E. and M.S.E.E. from Iowa State University in 1964 and 1966 respectively. In 1971, he received a Ph.D. in electrical engineering from Arizona State University. His Ph.D. dissertation developed and applied Context Sensitive Systems (CSS) theory to explicitly represent and assist understanding complex, non-linear distributed adaptive systems.

In addition, Clymer is a Fellow of the Orange County, California Engineering Council; was 1992 Section Chair for IEEE of Orange County; and was a Hughes Faculty Research Award recipient from 1989-1990. He has been a member of INCOSE since its beginning, and was named INCOSE Fellow this year at IS 2008.

=== In education ===
He has been teaching since 1977. At CSUF, Dr. Clymer is a founding-member and principal investigator for the Applied Research Center for Systems Science. In addition, Clymer teaches systems engineering courses through the UC Irvine Extension, and he is on the board of CSUF Extension Systems Engineering Certificate Program.

He has developed advanced graduate-level courses in systems engineering. He has published 60 papers and four books covering intelligent evolutionary systems, systems design and evaluation methodology, simulation, optimization, fuzzy control, and machine learning. His international recognition was achieved through extensive participation in INCOSE; in the Institute for Electrical and Electronic Engineers (IEEE), the Systems, Man, Cybernetics Society (SMC); and the Military Operations Research Society (MORS). His latest book is Simulation-Based Engineering of Complex Systems.

=== In systems engineering ===
As a practitioner, Clymer is an expert in systems design, analysis and evaluation, and optimization. Clymer is currently a systems engineering consultant for FORELL Enterprises. In addition to his current position at FORELL, Clymer has consulted (from 1984 to present) for Raytheon, the U.S. Navy, and Rockwell International (now The Boeing Company). Prior to that, from 1966 through 1984, Dr. Clymer was a systems engineer for General Electric and U.S. Navy Fleet Analysis Center (FLTAC). At FLTAC, Dr. Clymer led the team that developed a closed-loop missile test system.

Clymer also has two U.S. patents: (1) Combined Discrete-Event and Continuous Model Simulation and Analysis Tool and (2) Guidance System.

=== In research ===
As a researcher, Clymer is internationally known in the general area of simulation-based systems engineering. Clymer developed the OpEM graphical language based on parallel processing language concepts and mathematical linguistics. Models based on the OpEM graphical language have been successfully used for 30+ years in industry, government, and academia to perform operational modeling of complex systems. Over the years, Dr. Clymer and his project teams have developed models that include U.S. Navy destroyers, battle groups, and the Trident Submarine.
