= Institute for Systems Engineering =

Professional membership body

- Abbreviation: IfSE
- Formation: 1994
- Type: Professional organisation
- Purpose: Promotion and development of systems engineering practice
- Headquarters: United Kingdom
- Region served: United Kingdom
- Members: 1600
- President: Andrew Pemberton
- President Elect: Hazel Woodcock
- Affiliations: International Council on Systems Engineering
- Website: https://ifse.org.uk/
- Formerly called: INCOSE UK

The Institute for Systems Engineering (IfSE) is a United Kingdom–based professional membership organisation for systems engineering. It operates as the UK chapter of the International Council on Systems Engineering (INCOSE) and is licensed by the Engineering Council as a Professional Engineering Institution and able to award professional registration.

The organisation was established in 1994 as INCOSE UK and adopted its current name in 2025.

== History ==
The organisation was formed in 1994 as the United Kingdom chapter of the International Council on Systems Engineering (INCOSE).

In March 2025, it was granted a licence by the Engineering Council to assess candidates for professional registration.

It rebranded as the Institute for Systems Engineering (IfSE) in July 2025. IfSE is registered as a limited company in the UK.

== Activities ==
IfSE organises events for its members, including conferences, workshops and webinars. It hosts the Annual Systems Engineering Conference (ASEC).

The organisation also supports continuing professional development and provides guidance on professional registration. Through its technical, working and local groups it organises a regular regional events and publishes technical publications.

== Governance ==
IfSE is governed by a board and council of elected members. Much of its activity is delivered by volunteers through committees and working groups.

== Fellowship ==
A fellowship grade of membership was introduced in 2026. Seven inaugural fellows were appointed as part of an initial pilot, with a further pilot planned ahead of a wider rollout later in the year.

== Relationship to INCOSE ==
IfSE operates as the United Kingdom chapter of the International Council on Systems Engineering (INCOSE). IfSE has taken over INCOSE's "List 3" registration, of approved professional organisations and learned societies, which is used for personal tax relief under the UK's taxation authority, HMRC.

== See also ==
- Systems engineering
- Engineering Council
- International Council on Systems Engineering
- List of engineering societies
