= Tricotyledon theory of system design =

In systems engineering, the tricotyledon theory of system design (T3SD) is a mathematical theory of system design developed by A. Wayne Wymore. T3SD consists of a language for describing systems and requirements, which is based on set theory, a mathematical systems model based on port automata, and a precise definition of the different types of system requirements and relationships between requirements.

== System requirements model ==
- I/O requirement
- Performance requirement
- System test requirement
- Cost requirement
- Tradeoff requirement

== System design ==
- Based on set theory
- Transition systems
- Functional system design
- Buildable system design
