= Wolt Fabrycky =

American engineer (1932–2024)

Wolter Joseph Fabrycky (December 6, 1932 – November 6, 2024) was an American systems engineer, Lawrence Professor Emeritus of Industrial and Systems Engineering at Virginia Tech, and the principal of Academic Applications International.

== Biography ==
Wolter Fabrycky studied Industrial Engineering, receiving his BS in 1957 from Wichita State University and his Industrial Engineering MS in 1958 from the University of Arkansas. In 1962 Fabrycky received his PhD in engineering from Oklahoma State University where he was awarded an Ethyl Corporation Doctoral Fellowship.

Fabrycky began as a faculty member at the University of Arkansas in 1957 and continued at Oklahoma State University during 1962–65. In September 1965 he was appointed to the Industrial Engineering faculty at Virginia Tech, where he served for 30 years. There in 1968, he founded and chaired the Interdisciplinary Systems Engineering Graduate Program, served as Associate Dean of Engineering, and later became Virginia Tech's Dean of Research.

Over a half-century, Fabrycky received numerous engineering and systems engineering awards. He was elected Fellow in the Institute of Industrial Engineers in 1978; Fellow in the American Association for the Advancement of Science in 1980; Fellow in the International Council on Systems Engineering in 1999; and Fellow in the American Society for Engineering Education in 2007. Fabrycky received the Hotlzman Distinguished Educator Award from the Institute of Industrial Engineers in 1990; the Lohmann Medal from the College of Engineering at Oklahoma State in 1992; the Grant Award in 1994; the Wellington Award in 2004, and the INCOSE Pioneer Award with Benjamin S. Blanchard in 2000.

In 2006, Fabrycky founded, endowed, and was later Chairman Emeritus of Omega Alpha: the International Systems Engineering Honor Society. He initiated a Systems Engineering Doctoral Dissertation Showcase within Omega Alpha in 2016, with ten superb Systems Engineering doctoral dissertations exhibited during the years 2016–18. These dissertations provide a reliable global benchmark for SE doctoral research. Fabrycky was president of Alpha Pi Mu and a long time member of its Executive Council. Other honor societies to which he contributed were the Order of the Engineer, Tau Beta Pi, and Sigma Xi. Fabrycky died on November 6, 2024, at the age of 91.

== Publications ==
Fabrycky was author of almost two dozen textbook editions, revisions, and translations in Industrial and Systems Engineering, including:

- Fabrycky, Wolter J., Prab M. Ghare, and Paul E. Torgersen. Applied operations research and management science. Prentice-Hall, 1984.
- Banks, Jerry and Wolter J. Fabrycky. Procurement and inventory systems analysis. Prentice-Hall, 1987.
- Fabrycky, Wolter J. and Benjamin S. Blanchard. Life-cycle cost and economic analysis. Prentice-Hall, 1991.
- Fabrycky, Wolter J., Gerald J. Thuesen, and Dinesh Verma. Economic decision analysis, 3rd Ed. Prentice-Hall, 1998.
- Thuesen, Gerald J. and Wolter J. Fabrycky. Engineering economy, 9th Ed. Prentice-Hall, 2001.
- Blanchard, Benjamin S and Wolter J. Fabrycky. Systems engineering and analysis, 5th (30th anniversary Ed), Pearson Prentice Hall, 2011.

For more than a half-century, Wolter Fabrycky was a Prentice Hall (now Pearson Prentice Hall) author, reviewer, and editor of the PPH International Series in Industrial and Systems Engineering.
