= Harold Lawson =

American computer scientist

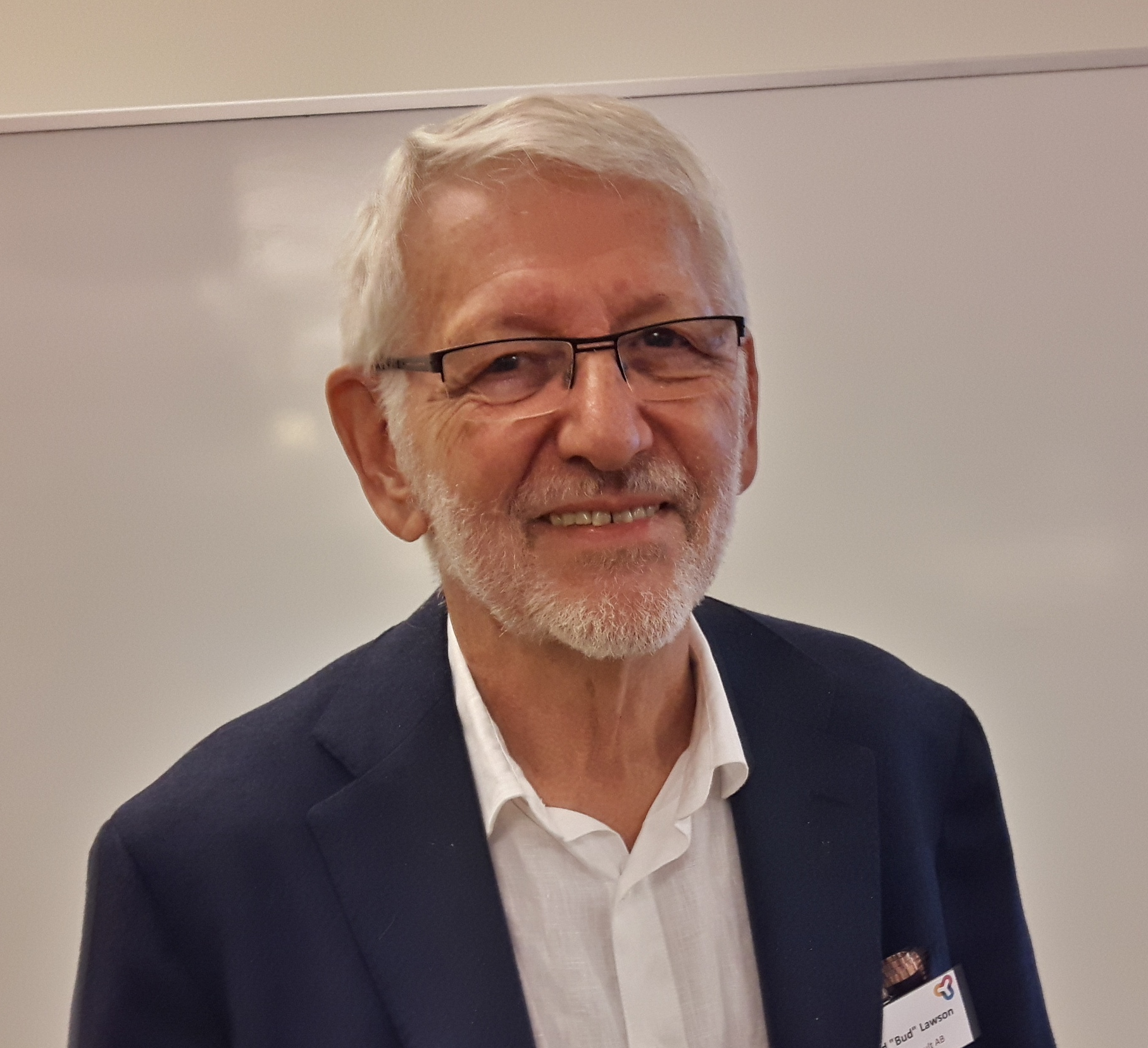
- Harold Lawson in 2017
- Born: 1937
- Died: 2019 (aged 81–82)
- Occupation: Software engineer
- Known for: Invention of the pointer in high-level programming languages (1964)

Harold W. "Bud" Lawson (1937–2019) was a software engineer, computer architect and systems engineer. Lawson is credited with the 1964 invention of the pointer in high-level programming languages (with "a lot of comments" from Donald Knuth and Douglas McIlroy). In 2000, Lawson was presented the Computer Pioneer Award by the IEEE for his invention.

== Career ==
In the beginning of his career he worked at the programming department at Univac with various compilers, reporting to Grace Hopper.

In July, 2010 he published a new book entitled A Journey Through the Systems Landscape (ISBN 978-1-84890-010-3) with College Publications. The book provides a comprehensive discipline-independent approach to learning to "think" and "act" in terms of systems.

Amongst several academic appointments, his last position was as Professor of Telecommunications and Computer Systems at Linköping University where he co-founded its Department of Computer and Information Science in 1983.

He was a Fellow of ACM, Fellow and Life Member of the IEEE, and Fellow of the International Council on Systems Engineering INCOSE IEEE Charles Babbage Computer Pioneer and INCOSE Systems Engineering Pioneer.

== Personal life ==
Lawson died in Stockholm on June 10, 2019, after a period of illness.
