= Andrew P. Sage =

American systems engineer, professor (1933–2014)

Andrew Patrick Sage (August 27, 1933 – October 31, 2014) was an American systems engineer and Emeritus Professor and Founding Dean Emeritus at the School of Information Technology and Engineering of the George Mason University.

== Biography ==
Born in Charleston, South Carolina Sage received his BA in 1955 in Electrical Engineering at The Citadel, The Military College of South Carolina, his MA in 1956 in Electrical Engineering from Massachusetts Institute of Technology, and his PhD also in Electrical Engineering in 1960 at the Purdue University.

After graduation Sage started his academic career in the early 1960s as Associate Professor at the University of Arizona, where he among other things did research on the electronic simulation of biological clocks, and bistable circuits. From 1964 to 1967 he was Professor of Electrical Engineering at the University of Florida, Gainesville From 1967 to 1974 he was chairman of the Information and Control Sciences Center at the Southern Methodist University in Dallas and Chair of the Electrical Engineering Department. From 1974 to 1984 at the University of Virginia he was Professor of Engineering Science and Systems Engineering, and finally in 1984 ended up at the George Mason University. Here he started as Professor of Information Technology and Engineering, and Dean of the School of Information Technology and Engineering. In 1996 he retired as was elected as Founding Dean Emeritus of the school.

In 1976 Sage was elected Life Fellow of IEEE "for contributions to engineering education, and to the theory of systems, identification, estimation, and control", and in 2004 he was elected members of the National Academy of Engineering. He received an honorary Doctor of Engineering degrees from the University of Waterloo in 1987, and Honorary Doctor of Engineering degrees from the Dalhousie University in 1997. He also was awarded the IEEE Donald G. Fink Prize Paper Award in 1994, the IEEE Simon Ramo Medal in 2000, and the INCOSE Pioneer Award in 2002.

== Publications ==
Andrew P. Sage published numerous books and articles in the field of systems engineering. Books, a selection:

- 1981: Andrew P. Sage, Systems engineering: Fundamental limits and future prospects, Proc. IEEE, vol. 69, pp. 158–166, Feb. 1981 (Describes presently perceived limits in systems engineering along with contemporary and projected future efforts to reach, circum vent, or ameliorate the effects of these limits)
- 1991, Andrew P. Sage, Decision Support Systems Engineering.
- 1992. Andrew P. Sage. Systems Engineering. Wiley-IEEE, 1992. ISBN 0471536393
- 1995, Andrew P. Sage, Systems Management for Information Technology and Software Engineering.
- 1999, Andrew P. Sage, Handbook of Systems Engineering.
