= Eberlein compactum =

In mathematics an Eberlein compactum, studied by William Frederick Eberlein, is a compact topological space homeomorphic to a subset of a Banach space with the weak topology. Every compact metric space, more generally every one-point compactification of a locally compact metric space, is Eberlein compact. The converse is not true.
