= Derek Hitchins =

British systems engineer

Derek K. Hitchins (born 1935) is a British systems engineer and was professor in engineering management, in command & control and in systems science at Cranfield University at Cranfield, Bedfordshire, England.

== Biography ==
Hitchins joined the Royal Air Force in 1952 as an apprentice and retired as a wing commander in 1973 to join industry. From 1975 to 1976 he worked as the system design manager of the Tornado ADV aviation company and technical coordinator for UKAIR CCIS. From 1975 to 1979 he was head of Integrated sciences in a grammar school, teaching physics, integrated science, mathematics, electronics, biology and astronomy to advanced level, with music, gymnastics and athletics as additional subjects.

In 1980 he returned to industry and held posts at two leading systems engineering companies as Marketing Director, Business Development Director and Technical Director. He also worked as UK Technical Director for the NATO Air Command and Control System (ACCS) project in Brussels before becoming an academic in 1988.

In 1988 he became professor in Engineering Management at City University, London. From 1990 to 1994 he held the British Aerospace Chairs in Systems Science and in Command and Control, Cranfield University at RMCS Shrivenham. After his retirement in 1994 he continued as a part-time consultant, teacher, visiting professor and international lecturer.

He was the inaugural president of the UK chapter of INCOSE, and also the inaugural chairman of the Institution of Electrical Engineers’ (IEE’s) Professional Group on Systems Engineering. For many years he was an independent member of the UK Defence Scientific Advisory Board.

== Work ==
His current research is into system thinking, system requirements, social psychology & anthropology, Egyptology, command & control, system design and world-class systems engineering.

== Publications ==
Hitchins wrote several books and article. A selection:

- 1990. Conceiving Systems. Thesis (Ph.D.) City University, 1990.
- 1992. Draft Guide to the Practice of System Engineering. With John C. Boarder and Patrick D. R. Moore. Institution of Electrical Engineers.
- 1993. Putting Systems to Work,
- 2000. Getting to Grips with Complexity or... A Theory of Everything Else...
- 2003, Advanced Systems Thinking, Engineering and Management, Norwood MA: Artech House.
- 2003. The Pyramid Builder's Handbook
- 2003. The Secret Diaries of Hemiunu
- 2007. Systems Engineering: A 21st Century Systems Methodology.

Articles, a selection:

- 2003, Systems Methodology, paper.
- 2003, What’s in a System-of-Systems?, paper.
