= William Frederick Eberlein =

American mathematician

William Frederick Eberlein (June 25, 1917, Shawano, Wisconsin – 1986, Rochester, New York) was an American mathematician, specializing in mathematical analysis and mathematical physics.

== Life ==
Eberlein studied from 1936 to 1942 at the University of Wisconsin and at Harvard University, where he received in 1942 a PhD for the thesis Closure, Convexity, and Linearity in Banach Spaces under the direction of Marshall Stone.

He was married twice—to Mary Bernarda Barry and Patricia Ramsay James. He had four children with Mary Barry, including Patrick Barry Eberlein, another renowned mathematician. Patricia Ramsay James was a mathematician who moved into computer science as the field opened up; their one child is Kristen James Eberlein, the chair of the OASIS Darwin Information Typing Architecture Technical Committee.

== Work ==
Eberlein had academic positions at the Institute for Advanced Study (1947–1948), at the University of Wisconsin (1948–1955), at Wayne State University (1955–1956), and from 1957 at the University of Rochester, where he remained for the rest of his career. His doctoral students include William F. Donoghue, Jr. and A. Wayne Wymore.

== Contributions ==
He worked on functional analysis, harmonic analysis, ergodic theory, mean value theorems, and numerical integration. Eberlein also worked on spacetime models, internal symmetries in gauge theory, and spinors. His name is attached to the Eberlein–Šmulian theorem in functional analysis, the Eberlein compacta in topology, and the Eberlein mean ergodic theorem.
