= Kevin Forsberg =

American engineer (born 1934)

Kevin John Forsberg (born 1934) is an American engineer, business consultant, and with Harold Mooz co-founder and executive director of The Center for Systems Management, who was awarded the INCOSE Pioneer Award in 2001.

== Biography ==
Forsberg received his BS in Civil Engineering from Massachusetts Institute of Technology in 1956, and proceeded to study at Stanford University, where he received his MA and in 1961 his PhD in Engineering Mechanics for the thesis "Concentrated load on a shallow elliptic paraboloid."

Forsberg started his career working for Lockheed Martin Space Systems at the Lockheed Missiles and Space Company, Palo Alto, California. In the mid-1950s he participated in the Corona program. After graduation Forsberg started working for NASA at the Center for Systems Management. Late 1960s he returned to Lockheed, where he worked over a decade at the Research Laboratories of the Lockheed Missiles and Space Company, Palo Alto, California.

Late 1970s he started as independent business consultant, and co-founded the management training and consulting company The Center for Systems Management, Inc. He is a member of the Project Management Institute and of INCOSE.

Forsberg was elected Life-time Fellow by the American Society of Mechanical Engineers (ASME) in 1976; and elected Certified Systems Engineering Professional (CSEP) by INCOSE in 2004. He was awarded in 1981 the NASA Public Service Medal for "his outstanding technical and managerial contributions to the Space Shuttle Program." With Harold Mooz he is awarded both the Agency Seal Medal and in 2001 the INCOSE Pioneer Award acknowledging "Working as a team with Kevin Forsberg, he has pioneered and tirelessly promoted the concept of the integration of system engineering and project management into a single seamless process. In addition to his own work on complex development projects, he has taught thousands of professionals around the globe, both through tutorials and presentations and through his book, written with Dr.Forsberg, “Visualizing Project Management”."

== Selected publications ==
Forsberg has authored and co-authored several books on systems engineering and project management. A selection:

- Forsberg, Kevin, The Social Side of Technical Engineering: a Case Study. 1956.
- Forsberg, Kevin, Concentrated load on a shallow elliptic paraboloid. Thesis Division of Engineering Mechanics, Stanford University. 1961.
- Forsberg, Kevin, Hal Mooz, and Howard Cotterman. Visualizing project management: a model for business and technical success. John Wiley and Sons, 2000.
- C Haskins, K Forsberg. Systems Engineering Handbook: A Guide for System Life Cycle Processes and Activities; INCOSE, 2011

Articles, a selection:

- Forsberg, Kevin. "Influence of boundary conditions on the modal characteristics of thin cylindrical shells." AIAA journal 2.12 (1964): 2150-2157.
- Forsberg, Kevin, and Harold Mooz. "The relationship of system engineering to the project cycle." Proceedings of the First Annual Symposium of National Council on System Engineering. October 1991: 57–65.
- Forsberg, Kevin, and Harold Mooz. "System engineering for faster, cheaper, better." 1999 Ninth annual international symposium (INCOSE), Brighton, England. 1999.
- Mooz, Harold, and Kevin Forsberg. "The dual vee—illuminating the management of complexity." Proc 16th Annu Int Symp INCOSE, Orlando, FL. 2006.
