= Harry H. Goode =

Harry H. Goode (June 30, 1909 – October 30, 1960) was an American computer engineer and systems engineer and professor at the University of Michigan. He is known as co-author of the book Systems Engineering from 1957, which is one of the earliest significant books directly related to systems engineering.

== Biography ==
Harry H. Goode (née Goodstein) was born in New York City in 1909. He received his B.A. in history from New York University in 1931, when the country was in the depths of the Depression. While studying chemical engineering at Cooper Union, Goode earned his living playing the clarinet and saxophone in New York jazz bands. He received his second bachelor's degree in 1940. During the war he attended Columbia University and received a master's degree in mathematics in 1945.

In 1941 Goode started working as a statistician for the New York City Department of Health. From 1946 to 1949 Goode worked for the U.S. Navy in Sands Point, Long Island, where he became head of the Special Projects Branch. Here he contributed to flight control simulation training, aircraft instrumentation, antisubmarine warfare, weapons systems design, and computer research and initiated computerbased simulation projects.

In the 1950s Goode became professor at the University of Michigan. Until his death in 1960 he was president of the National Joint Computer Committee (NJCC). He was the principal architect of what was to become AFIPS (American Federation of Information Processing Societies). Had he lived, Goode undoubtedly would have become the first president of AFIPS, for he was the prime mover in organizing the three American constituent societies that were members of NJCC into one federation.

== Work ==
Harry Goode worked on the research frontiers of Management Science, Operations Research and Systems engineering in connection with organisms as systems, the reactions of groups, models of human preference, the experimental exploration of human observation, detection, and decision making, and the analysis and synthesis of speech.

== Harry H. Goode Memorial Award ==
The IEEE Computer Society yearly awards a Harry H. Goode Memorial Award for achievements in the information processing field which are considered either a single contribution of theory, design, or technique of outstanding significance, or the accumulation of important contributions on theory or practice over an extended time period, the total of which represent an outstanding contribution.

== Publications ==
Goode wrote several books and articles. Books:

- 1944 Mathematical Analysis of Ordinary and Deviated Pursuit Curves, with Leonard Gillman, Special Devices Section, Training Division, Bureau of Aeronautics, Navy Department, 264 pp. 1944.
- 1957 Systems Engineering: An Introduction to the Design of Large-Scale Systems, with Robert Engel Machol, McGraw-Hill, 551 pp.

Articles, a selection:

- 1945 "Service Records and Their Administrative Uses", with Abraham H. Kantrow, Leona Baumgartner, in: Am J Public Health Nations Health. 1945 October; 35(10): 1063–1069.
- 1956 "The Use of a Digital Computer to Model a Signalized Intersection", with C.H. Pollmar and J.B. Wright, in: Proceedings of Highway Research Board, vol. 35, 1956, pp. 548 – 557.
- 1957 "Survey of Operations Research and Systems Engineering", Paper presented at Conference of Engineering Deans on Science and Technology, Purdue University, September 1957.
- 1958 "Greenhouses of Science for Management", in: Management Science, Vol. 4, No. 4 (Jul. 1958), pp. 365–381. doi:10.1287/mnsc.4.4.365
- 1958 "Simulation: Simulation and display of four inter-related vehicular traffic intersections", with C. True Wendell, Paper presented at the 13th national meeting of the Association for Computing Machinery ACM '58.

About Harry H. Goode:

- Isaac L. Auerbach, "Harry H. Goode, June 30, 1909-October 30, 1960", IEEE Annals of the History of Computing, vol. 08, no. 3, pp. 257–260, Jul-Sept 1986. doi:10.1109/MAHC.1986.10051
- Robert E. Machol, Harry H. Goode, System Engineer, in: Science, Volume 133, Issue 3456, pp. 864–866, 03/1961. doi:10.1126/science.133.3456.864
