= Gordon J. F. MacDonald =

American geophysicist (1929-2002)

Gordon James Fraser MacDonald (July 30, 1929 – May 14, 2002) was an American geophysicist and environmental scientist, best known for his principled skepticism regarding continental drift (now called plate tectonics), involvement in the development of the McNamara Line electronic defense barrier during the Vietnam War, and early research and advocacy on human-made global climate change. MacDonald was admired for his creative mind, and his ability to connect scientific issues and matters of public policy.

MacDonald was born in Mexico of a Scottish father and white American mother. A childhood bout with polio only sharpened his competitive instincts. He applied to Harvard for a football scholarship and graduated summa cum laude at the age of 20. Remaining at Harvard, he became a Harvard Junior Fellow, then received his Ph.D. in geology in 1954. MacDonald was a faculty member at MIT (1954–1958), UCLA (1958–1966), UC Santa Barbara (1968–1970), Dartmouth (1972–1983) and UCSD (1990–1996).

Outside of academia, MacDonald was a long-time member of the elite JASON advisory group of scientists. He served on the original Presidential Council on Environmental Quality (1970–1972). President Nixon remarked at the time, "I have three members of the Harvard class of 1950 on my staff, all summa cum laude." The reference was to Henry Kissinger, James Schlesinger, and MacDonald. MacDonald chaired the CIA's MEDEA Committee (1993–1996), a group of environmental scientists convened by the CIA to study whether data from classified intelligence systems could shed light on global environmental issues. He was awarded the CIA's Agency Seal Medallion in 1994. He was Chief Scientist and Vice President of the MITRE Corporation from 1983 to 1990. He later became the director of the International Institute for Applied Systems Analysis.

== McNamara Line ==
MacDonald chaired the JASON committee that designed the Vietnam War's "McNamara Line" system of electronic border surveillance. The JASON scientists came under widespread public attack during the Vietnam War; MacDonald's garage in Santa Barbara was burned down.

== Plate tectonics ==
MacDonald's early skepticism regarding plate tectonics stemmed from his detailed study, with Walter Munk, of the rotation of the Earth. Since small polar motions are readily detectable on human time scales, the possibility of explaining paleomagnetic data by polar wandering seemed, for a time, to be a viable possibility; plate tectonic motions are now considered to be the correct explanation.

== Climate change ==
MacDonald was a prominent early scientific advocate of action to address the threat of global warming from fossil-fuel combustion. By the 1960s, MacDonald was publicly concerned about the potential risks of industrial climate change, both aerosol-induced global cooling and carbon-dioxide driven global warming. MacDonald contributed to the President's Science Advisory Committee environmental report in 1965 and the National Academy of Sciences report in 1966 that warned of such risks. In 1969 he began a JASON project to model climate change that soon convinced him that fossil-fuel burning would lead to dangerous global warming that would outstrip any industrial cooling effects. In 1978 MacDonald appeared on The MacNeil/Lehrer Report, and in 1979 was in an issue of People Magazine, to warn about fossil-fuel-driven global warming.

In 1980 testimony to Congress, he warned that the climate changes due to a doubling of carbon dioxide in the atmosphere would "probably have a profound effect on agriculture, on all aspects of energy use and generation, and on water and land use." "The dilemma we face is of historic proportions," he said. "Economies around the world depend on the energy derived from carbon-based fuels. The continued use of these fuels will irreversibly change global climate, placing heavy stresses on societies around the world."

MacDonald's interest in climate change was related to his work on weather modification, a controversial but once seemingly viable enterprise. He served on the NSF Advisory Panel for Weather Modification in 1964–1967. That panel's conclusion, that weather modification was possible, was immediately attacked on statistical grounds. An article in the Journal of the American Statistical Association (June, 1967) concluded, "That such nonsense should appear under the aegis of the National Academy of Sciences is deplorable."

MacDonald also published work on other aspects of climatology, hypothesizing the role of Milankovitch cycles and methane clathrates as drivers of natural climate changes. In 2002, he published a book involving his research with fellow JASON physicist Richard A. Muller.

== Awards and recognition ==
A member of the National Academy of Sciences (elected at the age of 32), the American Academy of Arts and Sciences, and the American Philosophical Society, MacDonald was also the recipient of the James B. Macelwane Medal of the American Geophysical Union (1965).

MacDonald's opinion about an inhibiting impact of funding, policy and politics on scientific innovation is reflected in this 2003 quote, ”In all science there is a strong 'herd instinct', and interactions occur largely within these herds. They may argue vigorously about details, but they maintain solidarity, or close ranks, when challenged by other herds or individuals. The herd instinct is strengthened greatly if those making funding decisions are members of that herd. Strays do not get funded, and their work, no matter how innovative, is neglected as the herd rumbles on. Herd members will change their views rapidly, however, if the herd leaders change direction. By contrast, if the innovators are not part of the herd it becomes very difficult, or impossible, for them to change the herd's direction.”

== Books ==
- Ice Ages and Astronomical Causes: Data, spectral analysis and mechanisms, by Richard A. Muller and Gordon J. MacDonald (2002)
- The Rotation of the Earth: A Geophysical Discussion, by Walter Munk and Gordon J. MacDonald. Cambridge University Press, New York, 1960
