= William V. Trollinger =

American geologist (1931–2002)

- Born: August 13, 1931; Asheville, North Carolina
- Died: September 13, 2002 (aged 71); Tyler, Texas
- Occupations: Geologist, Photogeologist
- Known for: Risha gas field Corona Program
- Awards: Agency Seal Medal (1987)

William Vance "Bill" Trollinger (August 13, 1931 – September 13, 2002) was an American geologist specializing in remote sensing and photogrammetry. He is noted for applying geomorphology to petroleum exploration, which led to the discovery of the Risha gas field in Jordan, and for his service as a photo-interpreter for the United States intelligence community during the Cold War.

== Early life and education ==
Born in Asheville, North Carolina, Trollinger graduated from Manual High School in Louisville, Kentucky. He attended Washington and Lee University, where he played football and earned his degree in 1953. During the Korean War, he served as a photo-intelligence officer in the United States Navy, acquiring the aerial photography interpretation skills that would later define his civilian career.

== Career ==
Trollinger began his professional life in 1957 with the Denver consulting firm Doeringfeld, Amuedo and Ivey before establishing his own company, Trollinger Geological Associates (TGA), in 1962. TGA focused on "applied geomorphic analysis," mapping structural anomalies in the earth's crust via aerial and satellite imagery to aid exploration companies. He later expanded his business interests by co-founding Marsh Oil and Gas (MOG) and Trollinger-Marsh Resources (TMR) with partner Philip Marsh.

Concurrent with his commercial work, Trollinger consulted for the U.S. intelligence community. Recruited for his proficiency in high-altitude photography, he worked on the Corona Program, the initial American spy satellite initiative managed by the Central Intelligence Agency (CIA) and the National Reconnaissance Office. His intelligence work included analyzing aerial surveillance during the Cuban Missile Crisis. In recognition of his contributions, the CIA awarded him the Agency Seal Medal in 1987, an honor presented to non-Agency personnel.

In the 1980s, Trollinger consulted for the government of Jordan, conducting geomorphic analyses of the country's eastern desert. His work identified the Risha gas field near the Iraqi border, a discovery that proved vital for Jordan's domestic electricity production. King Hussein of Jordan credited Trollinger with the find, referring to him as "the father of the Risha gas field."

== Personal life ==
Trollinger was married to Patricia White Trollinger until her death in 1993; he subsequently married Marilyn Wood Trollinger. He died in Tyler, Texas, on September 13, 2002.
