= Robert E. Machol =

American systems engineer

- Born: October 6, 1917; New York, USA
- Died: November 12, 1998 (aged 81); Maryland, USA
- Occupations: systems engineer professor of systems
- Employer(s): Various universities for his professorship Federal Aviation Administration (Chief Scientist)
- Organization(s): Operations Research Society of America (president)
- Known for: Author of one of the earliest significant books directly related to systems engineering
- Notable work: System Engineering: An Introduction to the Design of Large-Scale Systems (co-author of the 1957 book)

Robert Engel Machol (October 16, 1917 in New York, USA – November 12, 1998 in Maryland, USA) was an American systems engineer and professor of systems at the Kellogg Graduate School of Management of Northwestern University. Machol wrote the earliest significant books directly related to systems engineering. He was also Chief Scientist for the Federal Aviation Administration, President of the Operations Research Society of America, and an encyclopedia editor.

== Biography ==
Machol was raised in New York City, New York. After graduation from Harvard University in 1940 he enlisted in the United States Navy with the intention to become an aviator. Although he did not earn his pilot's wings, he emerged from World War II holding the rank of lieutenant commander.

Following the war Machol worked for the Operations Evaluation Group of the U.S. Navy Center for Naval Operations and then as editor for scientific articles for the Funk and Wagnalls Encyclopedia. In 1951, he was hired as the Technical Editor for the University of Michigan's Willow Run Laboratories (which later became the Environmental Research Institute of Michigan after the Laboratory separated from the University of Michigan). Willow Run was a research organization that was engaged in scientific and applied research in systems engineering, operations research, computer science, and electronics under contract to the Department of Defense. Its principal work, which involved looking for improved ways of defending the United States against air attack, led to the ground-breaking book, "System Engineering," co-authored with Harry H. Goode. By 1958 Machol obtained a Ph.D. in chemistry from the University of Michigan and became an associate professor of Electrical Engineering (later full Professor) at Purdue University in Lafayette, Indiana. In 1960 he moved back to Michigan as Vice President Systems of Conductron, a technology startup in an era when there were almost no such startups.

In 1964, Machol became chairman of the newly formed department of Systems Engineering at the University of Illinois, Chicago. From 1967 to 1986 he was a professor of systems at the Kellogg Graduate School of Management of Northwestern University.

During this career, he also was a consultant to NASA, the Office of Naval Research, and the U.S. Department of Defense. After his retirement from Northwestern in 1987 he embarked on a second career as chief scientist for the Federal Aviation Administration (FAA) where he worked until 1996.

His early work as scientific editor led to his selection as chair of the Operations Research Society of America's Publications Committee, and later as editor of a book series, Studies in Management Science and Systems, published by The Institute of Management Sciences (TIMS).

Machol served as secretary, and later 1971 as president of the Operations Research Society of America and was honored with that organization's George E. Kimball Medal in 1992. He was awarded an honorary doctorate by the Embry-Riddle Aeronautical University, the world's premier aviation university, on whose Board of Directors he had served.

Quite beyond his professional achievements, he was widely considered one of the most colorful individuals that the Operations Research profession has ever produced. See, for example, the tribute titled "A Hero Is Nothing But Bob Machol."

At the time of his death in 1998, he was survived by his wife, Florence, a son and daughter (Margot Machol), and four grandchildren.

== Work ==
Machol's work involved a number of strands — aviation, scientific writing, systems engineering, chemistry, applying Operations Research to sports, computing, and mushrooms — that intertwined over the years. As indicated by the references, he published in each of these areas.

=== System engineering ===
In 1957, Machol co-authored the book "System Engineering: An Introduction to the Design of Large-Scale Systems". This was one of the first authoritative texts in the field. This book covers the philosophy and methodology of system engineering. It also included chapters which made the book one of the first to introduce Operations Research to engineers. Although coming out of studies of large military systems, its concepts are applicable to systems of all kinds.

=== Aviation ===
Machol had a lifelong interest in aviation, starting with his days in the Navy. He continued to pursue his interest in aviation as a consultant to the Airline Pilots Association (ALPA). The pilot's union was concerned with safety issues — in particular, potential mid-air collisions of bunched planes — over portions of the North Atlantic that were not covered by radar. This work resulted in publications on the allowable separation distance between jet aircraft over the Atlantic and led to a protocol that exists to this day – and which has resulted in no mid-air collisions in this space.

=== Aircraft danger from turbulence ===
Early in his tenure at the FAA, he researched potential dangers to small aircraft created by wake turbulence from the Boeing 757. Eventually, the FAA ordered landing aircraft to increase their distance behind the jetliners.

=== Sports analytics ===
The Wall Street Journal has credited Machol with laying the foundation for a subsequent revolution in data-based NFL play-calling. With his student, former Bears and Bengals quarterback Virgil Carter, he wrote and supervised multiple peer-reviewed articles in the 1970s demonstrating that analytics-based decisions were often more successful than traditional intuitive actions. With track and field Olympian Shaul Ladany, also in the 1970s, he showed the application of data analytics to other sports as well.

== Publications ==
Machol was the author of several books, including

- 1957, System Engineering, with Harry H. Goode.
- 1960, Information and Decision Processes.
- 1962, Recent Developments in Information and Decision Processes with Paul Gray
- 1965, System Engineering Handbook, Robert E. Machol, Wilson P. Tanner, and Samuel N. Alexander (eds.)
- 1976, Elementary Systems Mathematics : Linear Programming for Business and the Social Sciences
- 1976, Management Science Applications to Sports (Studies in management science and systems; v. 4) Robert E. Machol and S.P. Ladany (eds.)
- 1977, Optimal Strategies in Sports (Studies in management science and systems; v. 5), Robert E. Machol and S. P. Ladany (eds.)
