= William F. Donoghue Jr. =

American mathematician

William Francis Donoghue Jr. (7 September 1921 – 4 April 2002, Irvine, California) was an American mathematician, specializing in analysis.

== Biography ==
Donoghue received in 1951 his PhD from the University of Wisconsin–Madison. His dissertation The Bounded Closure of Locally Convex Spaces was written under the supervision of William Frederick Eberlein. Donoghue taught and did research at the University of Kansas, New York University, and Michigan State University, before he became in 1965 a professor at the University of California, Irvine.

For the academic year 1958/59 he was a Guggenheim Fellow in Sweden. For four months in 1962 he was a visiting professor at the University of Paris. He spent the academic year 1972/73 on sabbatical at the University of Lund.

On January 26, 1974, he married Grace Koo in Orange County, California.

== Selected publications ==
=== Articles ===
- Donoghue, William F.; Smith, Kennan T. (1952). "On the Symmetry and Bounded Closure of Locally Convex Spaces". Transactions of the American Mathematical Society. 73 (2): 321. doi:10.2307/1990672. JSTOR 1990672.
- Donoghue, W. F. (1957). "The lattice of invariant subspaces of a completely continuous quasi-nilpotent transformation" (PDF). Pacific Journal of Mathematics. 7 (2): 1031–1035. doi:10.2140/pjm.1957.7.1031.
- Donoghue, William F. (1957). "On the numerical range of a bounded operator". The Michigan Mathematical Journal. 4 (3): 261–263. doi:10.1307/mmj/1028997958.
- Kelley, John L.; Namioka, Isaac; Donoghue, W. F.; Lucas, Kenneth R.; Pettis, B. J.; Poulsen, Ebbe Thue; Price, G. Baley; Robertson, Wendy; Scott, W. R.; Smith, Kennan T. (1963). Linear Topological Spaces. Graduate Texts in Mathematics. Vol. 36. pp. 26–82. doi:10.1007/978-3-662-41914-4_2. ISBN 978-3-662-41768-3.
- Donoghue, William F. (1963). "On a problem of Nieminen" (PDF). Publications Mathématiques de l'IHÉS. 16: 31–33. doi:10.1007/BF02684290. S2CID 123148716.
- Donoghue, William F. (1965). "On the perturbation of spectra". Communications on Pure and Applied Mathematics. 18 (4): 559–579. doi:10.1002/cpa.3160180402.
- Donoghue, William F. (1965). "On the lifting property". Proceedings of the American Mathematical Society. 16 (5): 913–914. doi:10.1090/S0002-9939-1965-0208353-3. ISSN 0002-9939.
- Donoghue, William F. (1966). "The theorems of Loewner and Pick". Israel Journal of Mathematics. 4 (3): 153–170. doi:10.1007/BF02760074.
- Donoghue, William F. (1967). "The interpolation of quadratic norms" (PDF). Acta Mathematica. 118: 251–270. doi:10.1007/BF02392483.
- Donoghue, William F. (1980). "Monotone operator functions on arbitrary sets". Proceedings of the American Mathematical Society. 78: 93–96. doi:10.1090/S0002-9939-1980-0548091-9.
- Donoghue, William F. (1980). "Reproducing Kernel Spaces and Analytic Continuation". The Rocky Mountain Journal of Mathematics. 10 (1): 85–97. doi:10.1216/RMJ-1980-10-1-85. JSTOR 44236514.

=== Books ===
- Distributions and Fourier Transforms. Academic Press. 2014. ISBN 9780080873442; pbk reprint of 1969 original
- Monotone Matrix Functions and Analytic Continuation. Grundlehren der mathematischen Wissenschaften. Vol. 207. Springer. 2012-12-06. ISBN 9783642657559; pbk reprint of 1974 original
