= Benjamin S. Blanchard =

American systems engineer (1929–2019)

Benjamin Seaver Blanchard, Jr. (July 20, 1929 – July 11, 2019) was an American systems engineer and emeritus professor of industrial and systems engineering at Virginia Tech, who was awarded the INCOSE Pioneer Award jointly with Wolt J. Fabrycky as "practitioner, teacher, and advocate of Systems Engineering."

== Biography ==
Blanchard received his BS in civil engineering from the University of Maine in 1951, and did some graduate coursework in electrical engineering. In 1969, he received his MBA from the University of Rochester as part of an executive development program.

In the early 1950s, Blanchard started working at U.S. Air Force, where he became electronics maintenance officer. In 1953, he moved to industry working as engineer in the fields of design, field service, staff and management with Boeing Commercial Airplanes, Sanders Associates, Bendix Corporation, and General Dynamics. In 1970, he was appointed professor of industrial and systems engineering at Virginia Tech, where he served until his retirement in 1997. At Virginia Tech Blanchard has been assistant dean of the College of Engineering, and he has been visiting professor at the University of Exeter.

Blanchard has been president of the International Society of Logistics, and in 2000 was awarded the INCOSE Pioneer Award for his contributions as "practitioner, teacher, and advocate of Systems Engineering. His service, as a team member with Dr. Wolt Fabrycky, allowed them to articulate the principles and objectives of systems engineering in a manner that conveys the tremendous potential and value added by this discipline.".

Ben died after a brief illness on July 11, 2019, at his residence in Charlottesville, Virginia, surrounded by his family.

== Publications ==
Blanchard has authored and co-authored several textbooks and numerous articles. A selection:

- Blanchard, Benjamin S., and Wolter J. Fabrycky. Systems engineering and analysis. 5th Ed. Englewood Cliffs, New Jersey: Prentice Hall, 2010.
- Blanchard, Benjamin S. Design and manage to life cycle cost. Oregon: M/A Press, 1978.
- Fabrycky, Wolter J., and Benjamin S. Blanchard. Life-cycle cost and economic analysis. Englewood Cliffs, NJ: Prentice-Hall, 1991.
- Blanchard, Benjamin S. Maintainability: A key to effective serviceability and maintenance management. Vol. 13. John Wiley & Sons, 1995.
- Blanchard, Benjamin S. System engineering management. Vol. 4. Wiley, 2003.
