= Julian M. Goldman =

Julian M. Goldman is an American physician (anesthesiology and clinical informatics) and Medical Director of Biomedical Engineering at Mass General Brigham (formerly Partners Healthcare System). He is the creator of Plug and Play Interoperability Research Program set up to promote innovation in patient safety and clinical care improve patient safety and make healthcare more efficient. He has been part of both the Harvard Medical School and Massachusetts General Hospital.

== Awards ==
Goldman has received the International Council on Systems Engineering Pioneer Award – INCOSE – (2010) the American College of Clinical Engineering – ACCE – Award (2009) the AAMI Foundation/Institute for Technology in Health Care Clinical Application Award (2009) and the University of Colorado Chancellor's Bridge to the Future Award.

== Boards ==
Goldman is joint chairman of the FCC mcHealth Task Force, the Consumer Advisory Committee Work Group on Healthcare and the HIT Policy Committee FDASIA Workgroup Regulatory Subgroup. Goldman chairs both the ISO TC 121 Subcommittee 2 on Airway Devices and the Use Case Working Group of the Continua Health Alliance.
