= Philip M'Pherson =

Philip Keith M'Pherson (1927 - 27 April 2016) was a British systems engineer, consultant, Emeritus Professor of Systems Engineering & Management at the City University London, and founder of the Department of Systems Science at City University, also known as developer of the Inclusive Valuation Methodology.

== Biography ==
Born in London, United Kingdom, M'Pherson was educated as an engineer at Oxford University and Massachusetts Institute of Technology. He started his career as "hard-hat practitioner" at the Royal Navy, where he became gunnery engineer officer specialized in fire-control systems. In 1955 he was sent to MIT's Instrumentation Laboratory run by Charles Stark Draper to work on the development of Inertial navigation systems sharing ideas with pioneers as Norbert Wiener and Harold Chestnut.

Early 1960s M'Pherson left the Royal Navy and started for the United Kingdom Atomic Energy Authority, where he founded a research group focussed on the controlling of nuclear power reactors. They particularly focussed on "constructing mathematical models of nuclear reactor spatial dynamics using early digital computers with punched tape input-output." Mid-1960s he returned to the academic world to St John's College, Oxford. In 1967 he was appointed Professor of Systems Science at the City University London from 1967 to 1983, and Professor of Systems Engineering and Management from 1983 until his retirement in 1989. In 1972 he co-founded the Department of Systems Science at City University in London, which he headed for years. From 1981 to 1989 he was also Pro-vice-chancellor at the City University in London.

Beside his academic work M'Pherson worked as a management consultant and was director of the Systems & Value Limited company.

In 2006 M'Pherson was awarded the INCOSE Pioneer Award, acknowledging that "his appreciation for precise mathematical modeling in system design influenced submarine design for decades to follow... His lasting contribution to systems engineering is a clarity of understanding and quantifying the dynamic relationships among and within complex systems."

M'Pherson died gracefully on 27 April 2016 at Littleport Grange, near Ely, Cambridgeshire in his 90th year.

== Work ==
M’Pherson's research interests have been in the field of "decision models for policy research and systems design, value systems, dynamics and management of technology change technology assessment."

=== Systems science ===
In the 1974 article "A perspective on systems science and systems philosophy" M'Pherson presented a survey of systems science and systems philosophy intended to "provide an integrated, if personal, view of the ideas within the contemporary systems movement." According to M'Pherson:

Systems science is the ordered arrangement of knowledge acquired from the study of systems in the observable world, together with the application of this knowledge to the design of man-made systems.

M'Pherson concluded that reductionism and holism don't have to contradict, but that "philosophy, theories and methods in systems science and systems philosophy offer a means for bringing reductionism and holism into a satisfactory alliance."

=== Meaning and Value of Systems Engineering ===
M’Pherson acknowledged (2006) that the definition and meaning of Systems Engineering (SE) is the subject of ongoing discussion since it emerged in the 1950s. In this discussion many stakeholders are involved from individual systems engineers, corporate providers, and human operators inside the system to the end-users, who use the system's results.

In the context according to M’Pherson Systems Engineering "has the potential to contribute considerable positive intangible value, as well as reducing costs. But that value will not be fully realised until society can come to terms with 21st century complexity and appreciate the endeavours of the systems engineer of the future as the Master of Complexity."

=== Inclusive Value Methodology ===
The Inclusive Value Methodology is a method for the measurement of the assets of projects and organizations.

== Publications ==
M'Pherson has authored and co-authored various publications in the field of systems engineering. A selection:

- M'Pherson, P. K. "A perspective on systems science and systems philosophy." Futures 6.3 (1974): 219–239.
- M'Pherson, P. K. The Design of Multidimensional Value Criteria for Use in Decision, Design and Technology Assessment. City University, 1979.
- M'Pherson, P. K. "Systems engineering: an approach to whole-system design." Radio and Electronic Engineer 50.11.12 (1980): 545–558.
- M'Pherson, P. K. "A framework for systems engineering design." Radio and Electronic Engineer 51.2 (1981): 59–93.
- M'Pherson, P. K. "Systems engineering: a proposed definition." Physical Science, Measurement and Instrumentation, Management and Education-Reviews, IEE Proceedings A 133.6 (1986): 330–331.
- M'Pherson, Philip K. "Business value modelling." Aslib proceedings. Vol. 50. No. 7. MCB UP Ltd, 1998.
- M’Pherson, Philip K., and Stephen Pike. "Accounting, empirical measurement and intellectual capital." Journal of Intellectual Capital 2.3 (2001): 246–260.
