= Universal Systems Language =

Modeling language

Universal Systems Language (USL) is a systems modeling language and formal method for the specification and design of software and other complex systems. It was designed by Margaret Hamilton based on her experiences writing flight software for the Apollo program. The language is implemented through the 001 Tool Suite software by Hamilton Technologies, Inc. USL evolved from 001AXES which in turn evolved from AXES all of which are based on Hamilton's axioms of control. The 001 Tool Suite uses the preventive concept of Development Before the Fact (DBTF) for its life-cycle development process. DBTF eliminates errors as early as possible during the development process removing the need to look for errors after-the-fact.

== Philosophy ==
USL was inspired by Hamilton's recognition of patterns or categories of errors occurring during Apollo software development.

Certain correctness guarantees are embedded in the USL grammar.

USL is regarded by some users as more user-friendly than other formal systems. It is not only a formalism for software, but also defines ontologies for common elements of problem domains, such as physical space and event timing.

== Formalism for a theory of control ==
Primitive structures are universal in that they are able to be used to derive new abstract universal structures, functions or types. The process of deriving new objects (i.e., structures, types and functions) is equivalent to the process of deriving new types in a constructive type theory.

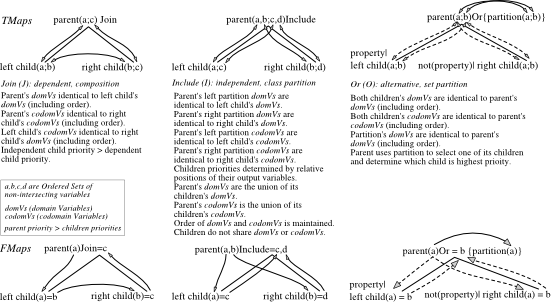
Figure. 1 The three primitive control structures and their rules form a universal foundation for constructing maps in the domains of time and space as FMaps and TMaps.

== Implementation ==
The process of developing a software system with USL together with its automation, the 001 Tool Suite (001), is as follows: define the system with USL, automatically analyze the definition with 001's analyzer to ensure that USL was used correctly, automatically generate much of the design and all of the implementation code with 001's generator. USL can be used to lend its formal support to other languages.

== See also ==
- Systems philosophy
- IDEF
- Model-driven architecture
- Systems modeling language
- Object process methodology
