= A. Wayne Wymore =

American mathematician (1927–2011)

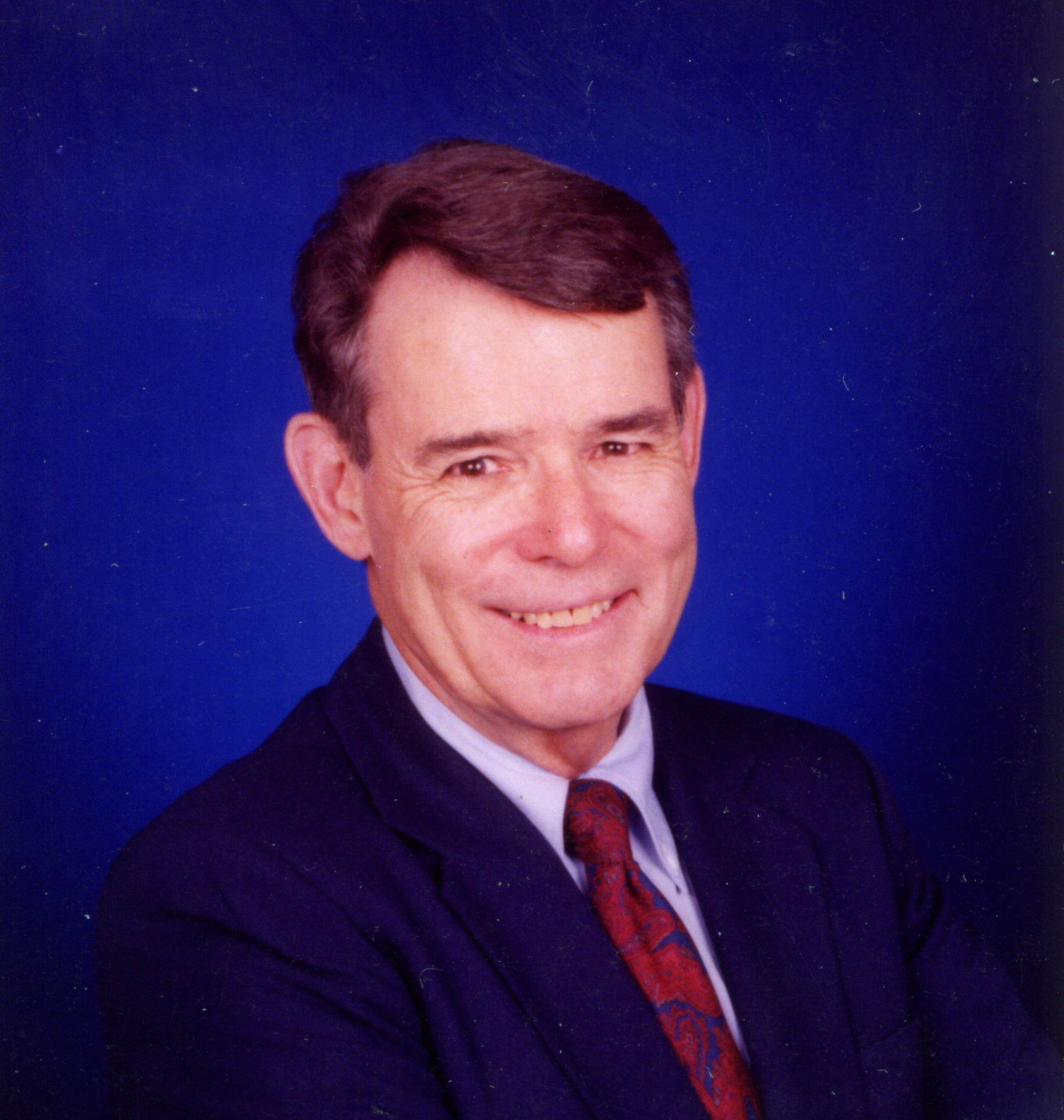
- Born: February 1, 1927
- Died: February 24, 2011 (aged 84)
- Education: University of Wisconsin–Madison
- Known for: Mathematical Theory of Systems Engineering, Founder and first Chairman of the SIE Department of the University of Arizona
- Awards: INCOSE Pioneers award, 2003
- Scientific career
- Fields: Systems Engineering, Mathematics
- Workplaces: University of Arizona, Professor Emeritus

Albert Wayne Wymore (February 1, 1927 – February 24, 2011) was an American mathematician, systems engineer, Professor Emeritus of Systems and Industrial Engineering of the University of Arizona, and one of the founding fathers of systems engineering.

== Biography ==
Wymore received both his B.Sc. and M.Sc. in mathematics from the Iowa State University early 1950s. In 1956 he received his PhD in mathematics from the University of Wisconsin–Madison under the Supervision of Associate Professor William F. Eberlein for the thesis "On the Weak Compactness in Functional Analysis".

With his PhD in pure mathematics, Wymore started his career in industry for two years. In 1956 he joined the faculty of University of Arizona, where in 1957 he established Universities first computing center, and the department of Systems and Industrial Engineering as part of the College of Engineering. Wymore became the first Chairman of Systems and Industrial Engineering (SIE) Department at the University of Arizona. He was also one of the first Fellows of the International Council on Systems Engineering (INCOSE).

== Publications ==
A selection:

- 1967. A Mathematical Theory of Systems Engineering: The Elements. Krieger, Huntington, NY.
- 1976. Systems Engineering Methodology for Interdisciplinary Teams, Wiley, New York.
- 1992. Engineering Modeling and Design, with Bill Chapman and A. Terry Bahill, CRC Press Inc.
- 1993. Model-Based Systems Engineering, CRC Press, Boca Raton.
