= Mary C. Lawton =

U.S. public official notable for legal opinion on presidential self-pardon power

Mary Catherine Lawton (c. 1935 - October 1993) was an American government attorney who served in the United States Department of Justice (DOJ) for over thirty years. A specialist in administrative law and intelligence policy, Lawton is known for authoring the 1974 Office of Legal Counsel memorandum concluding that a U.S. president cannot pardon himself. She later served as the DOJ's Counsel for Intelligence Policy, where she managed the implementation of the Foreign Intelligence Surveillance Act (FISA).

== Early life and education ==
Lawton attended the Georgetown University Law Center, graduating first in her class. During her legal studies, she was a member of the Board of Editors for the Georgetown Law Journal.

== Career ==
Lawton began her government service in the Office of Legal Counsel (OLC) at the Department of Justice. She eventually advanced to the position of deputy assistant attorney general within that office.

In 1974, amid the Watergate scandal and the potential resignation of Richard Nixon, Lawton drafted a memorandum addressing the constitutional scope of the presidential pardon power. Writing as the acting assistant attorney general for the OLC on August 5, 1974, she argued that a self-pardon would violate the legal principle that "no one may be a judge in his own case". The memorandum advised that if a president required a pardon, the constitutional mechanism would involve temporarily declaring an inability to perform presidential duties under the 25th Amendment, transferring power to the vice president, who would then possess the authority to grant a pardon. Lawton's opinion remains the standing Department of Justice precedent on the matter.

Following her tenure at the OLC, Lawton worked as General Counsel for the Corporation for Public Broadcasting and as an administrative law officer in the White House. She subsequently returned to the DOJ to head the Office of Intelligence Policy and Review (OIPR).

In her capacity as Counsel for Intelligence Policy, Lawton oversaw the departmental execution of the Foreign Intelligence Surveillance Act and the creation of the United States Foreign Intelligence Surveillance Court. She regularly testified before the House and Senate Intelligence Committees regarding the legal boundaries of wiretapping and counterintelligence surveillance. The New York Times obituary noted her role in defining U.S. intelligence policy during the Cold War.

== Death ==
Lawton died of a pulmonary embolism in October 1993 at age 58.

== Awards in her honor ==
The American Bar Association (ABA) Section of Administrative Law and Regulatory Practice established the Mary C. Lawton Award for Outstanding Government Service in her honor. Presented annually since 1989, it recognizes government attorneys for contributions to administrative law. Lawton had previously served on the Section's Council and as Chair of its Judicial Review Committee.

Additionally, the Department of Justice grants the Mary C. Lawton Lifetime Service Award. This honor recognizes career employees who have served for at least 20 years and have demonstrated high standards of excellence.
