= William W. Simmons (physicist) =

American physicist

William W. Simmons (born 1932) is an American physicist at TRW and Lawrence Livermore National Laboratory (LLNL), notable for his development of electro-optical devices.

== Biography ==
Simmons received his BA in Physics in 1953 from Carleton College and his MA in 1955 in Physics from University of Illinois at Urbana-Champaign, where in 1960 he also received his PhD in Physics.

After graduation he started at Space Technology Labs in the research and development of lasers and other electro-optic devices. Between 1968 and 1971 he returned to the Department of Engineering and Applied Science of the University of Illinois at Urbana-Champaign working as Associate Professor of electrical engineering. In 1972 he moved on to the Lawrence Livermore National Laboratory (LLNL), where he was project engineer in their new Laser Program. From 1985 till his retirement in 1992 he returned to TRW where he directed the research on "Solid State Lasers and Nonlinear Optics, Superconductive Electronics, and Semiconductor Diode Laser Devices and Arrays research groups."

Simmons was awarded the Distinguished Teaching in Engineering Award in 1972 from University of Illinois at Urbana-Champaign, and was awarded distinguished alumni in 2009 for his "outstanding original research contributions to the development of electro-optical devices, including pulsed ion lasers, very large laser systems, and semiconductor laser arrays, and for his leadership in furthering the national goal of fusion energy generation." In 1987 Simmons was awarded the IEEE Simon Ramo Medal for his "establishment and application of fundamental system design principles to the practical design and construction of very large solid-state laser facilities."

== Selected publications ==
- William W. Simmons (ed.) High power and solid state lasers : 23–24 January 1986, Los Angeles, California. Society of Photo-optical Instrumentation Engineers, American Association of Physicists in Medicine. 1986
