= Lui Pao Chuen =

Singaporean military scientist

Lui Pao Chuen DUBC is a Singaporean professor and former chief defence scientist who is presently the President at the Singapore Institute of Purchasing and Materials Management (SIPMM) and has had roles as Chairman of the Advisory Board of the Singapore Space and Technology Association; Advisor at the Ministry of National Development (MND); Senate Member at the Management Development Institute of Singapore; Founding Board of Trustees Member of the Singapore University of Technology and Design and Advisor of the National Research Foundation at the Prime Minister's Office of Singapore.

== Education ==
Chuen has a BSc (Hons) in Physics from Singapore University, an MA in Operations Research and Systems Analysis. He was awarded a Postgraduate fellowship from Ministry of Defence (MINDEF) and from the Singapore National Academy of Science in 2011.

== Career ==
=== Radio and Space Research Station ===
In 1965 Chuen was appointed scientific officer in the Radio and Space Research Station in Singapore. The following year he was promoted to the Logistics Division to work as Officer-in-Charge of the Test and Evaluation Section. Ten years after his first appointment, he became Special Projects Director.

=== Ministry of Defence ===
Chuen worked at the MINDEF for more than four decades. During this time he played a pivotal role in establishing the groundwork for Singapore's defense capacities within the army.

== Awards and recognition ==
- 1975: Singapore Armed ForcesGood Service Medal
- 1979: The Pingat Pentadbiran Awam (Silver)
- 1986: Chief Defence Scientist (first time appointee)
- 1992: The Pingat Pentadbiran Awam (Gold)
- 1997: Long Service Award for three decades of service in Singapore
- 2002: Distinguished Alumni Award from the US Naval Postgraduate School
- 2002: National Science and Technology Medal
- 2002: Inducted into Naval Postgraduate School Hall of Fame
- 2005: NUS Distinguished Science Alumni Award and Outstanding Service Award
- 2007: NUS University Outstanding Service Award
- 2008: Elected Honorary Fellow by the Institution of Engineers, Singapore
- 2011: IPS President Medal
- 2014: Institution of Engineers Singapore's Lifetime Engineering Achievements Award
- 2015: Inaugural Defence Technology Medal (Outstanding Service) from the Defence Minister
- 2025: Darjah Utama Bakti Cemerlang
