= Robert Harding =

United States Army general

Robert Harding is an American businessman and a retired major general in the Army.

President Obama announced his intent to nominate Harding as secretary of the Transportation Security Administration on March 8, 2010. On March 26, 2010, Harding took himself out consideration for the post.

== Harding Security Associates ==
Harding was president of his own defense consulting company, Harding Security Associates. In July 2008 Harding's company was awarded a $100 million contract with the US Army under a program that gives preference to contractors headed by disabled veterans. Harding had listed his disability as sleep apnea. Also, in 2008, Harding's company was audited and had its contract with the Defense Intelligence Agency terminated after performing $6 million of work. Harding's company agreed to return almost $2 million to the US government in that case. Harding sold the company in 2009.
