= International Council on Systems Engineering =

Internal engineering trades organisation

International Council on Systems Engineering (INCOSE)
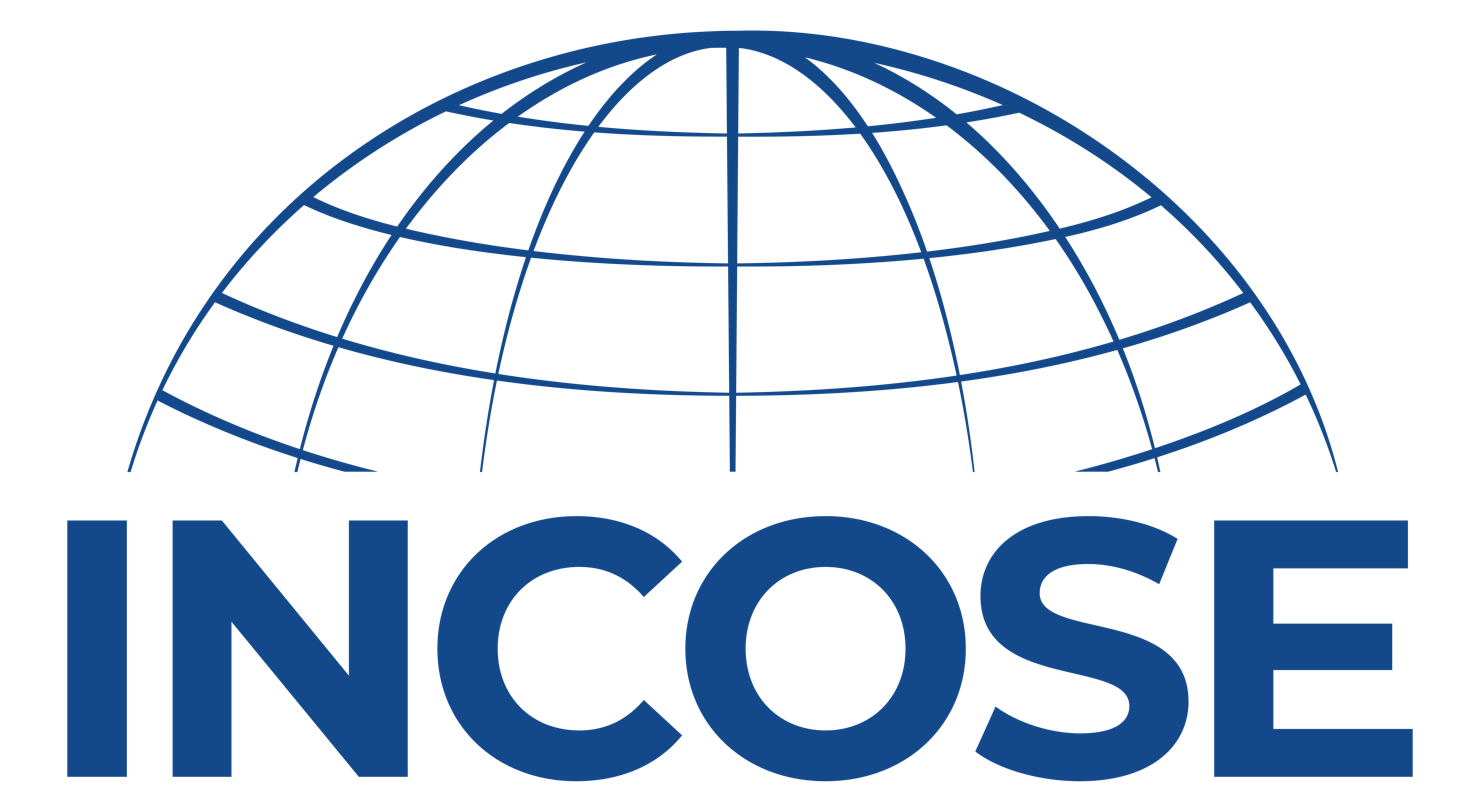
- Founded: 1990
- Type: Professional Organization
- Purpose: Systems Engineering
- Location: West Lafayette, Indiana, U.S.
- Origins: National Council on Systems Engineering (NCOSE)
- Region served: Worldwide
- Method: Industry standards, Conferences, Publications
- Members: 28,500+
- Key people: Michael D. Watson (current president)
- Website: www.incose.org

The International Council on Systems Engineering (INCOSE; pronounced /ɛn-koʊsi/) is a not-for-profit membership organization and professional society in the field of systems engineering with about 27,000 members and associates including individual, corporate, and student members. INCOSE's main activities include conferences, publications, local chapters, certifications and technical working groups.

The INCOSE International Symposium is usually held in July, and the INCOSE International Workshop is held in the United States or Europe in January.

Currently, there are about 70 local INCOSE chapters globally with most chapters outside the United States representing entire countries, while chapters within the United States represent cities or regions.

INCOSE organizes about 55 technical working groups with international membership, aimed at collaboration and the creation of INCOSE products, printed and online, in the field of Systems engineering. There are working groups for topics within systems engineering practice, systems engineering in particular industries and systems engineering's relationship to other related disciplines.

INCOSE produces two main periodicals: the journal, and the practitioner magazine, and a number of individual published works, including the INCOSE Handbook. In collaboration with the IEEE Systems Society and the Systems Engineering Research Center (SERC)/Stevens Institute of Technology, INCOSE produces and maintains the online Systems Engineering Body of Knowledge (SEBoK), a wiki-style reference open to contributions from anyone, but with content controlled and managed by an editorial board.

INCOSE certifies systems engineers through its three-tier certification process, which requires a combination of education, years of experience and passing an examination based on the INCOSE Systems Engineering Handbook.

INCOSE is a member organization of the Federation of Enterprise Architecture Professional Organizations (FEAPO), a worldwide association of professional organizations formed to advance the discipline of Enterprise Architecture.

== Purpose ==
The stated vision of INCOSE is "A better world through a systems approach" and its mission is "To address complex societal and technical challenges by enabling, promoting and advancing systems engineering and systems approaches." The organization's goals are focused on the creation and dissemination of systems engineering information, promoting international collaboration and promoting the profession of Systems engineering.

== Publications ==
- INCOSE Systems Engineering Handbook
- Systems Engineering
- INSIGHT Practitioner Journal
- Metrics Guidebook for Integrated Systems and Product Development
- I-pub publication database
- Systems Engineering Tools Database

== Standards ==
INCOSE's International Council on Systems Engineering Standards Technical Committee (STC) is working to advance and harmonize systems engineering standards used worldwide. Some of the notable standards the STC has been involved with are:

- ECSS-E-10 Space Engineering - Systems Engineering Part 1B: Requirements and process, 18 Nov 2004
- ECSS-E-10 Space Engineering - Systems Engineering Part 6A: Functional and technical specifications, 09 Jan 2004
- ECSS-E-10 Space Engineering - Systems Engineering Part 7A: Product data exchange, 25 August 2004
- ISO/IEC/IEEE 15288: 2023 - System and Software Engineering - System Life Cycle Processes
- OMG Systems Modeling Language (OMG SysML), July 2006

== Awards granted ==
- INCOSE Pioneer Award: annual prize for people who have made significant pioneering contributions to the field of Systems Engineering

== INCOSE (UK) name change ==
As of July 2025, the chapter of INCOSE in the UK, formerly known as INCOSE (UK), is now a Professional Engineering Institute, specifically the Institute for Systems Engineering, with the abbreviation IfSE, and is licensed by the Engineering Council.
