= Systems engineering =

Interdisciplinary field of engineering

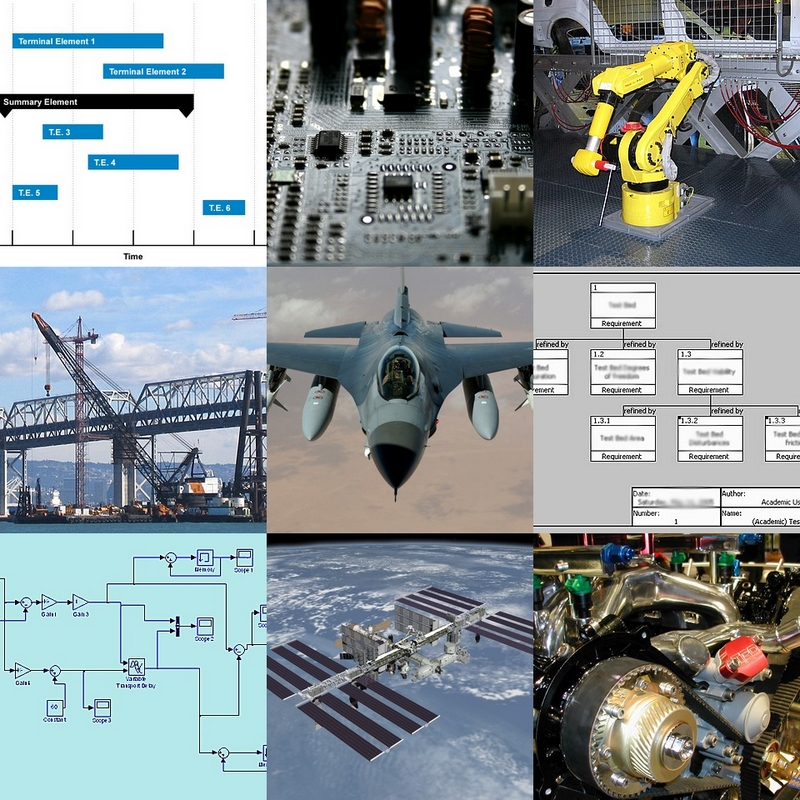
Systems engineering techniques are used in complex projects: printed-circuit-board design, robotics, bridge building, software integration, and spacecraft design. Systems engineering uses a host of tools that include modeling and simulation, requirements analysis, and scheduling to manage complexity.

Systems engineering is an interdisciplinary field of engineering and engineering management that focuses on how to design, integrate, and manage complex systems over their life cycles. At its core, systems engineering utilizes systems thinking principles to organize the systems engineering body of knowledge. The individual outcome of such efforts, an engineered system, can be defined as a combination of components that work in synergy to collectively perform a useful function.

Issues such as requirements engineering, reliability, logistics, coordination of different teams, testing and evaluation, maintainability, and many other disciplines, aka "ilities", necessary for successful system design, development, implementation, and ultimate decommissioning become more difficult when dealing with large or complex projects. Systems engineering deals with work processes, optimization methods, and risk management tools in such projects. It overlaps technical and human-centered disciplines such as industrial engineering, production systems engineering, process systems engineering, mechanical engineering, manufacturing engineering, production engineering, control engineering, software engineering, electrical engineering, cybernetics, aerospace engineering, organizational studies, civil engineering and project management. Systems engineering ensures that all likely aspects of a project or system are considered and integrated into a whole.

The systems engineering process is a discovery process that is quite unlike a manufacturing process. A manufacturing process is focused on repetitive activities that achieve high-quality outputs with minimum cost and time. The systems engineering process must begin by discovering the real problems that need to be resolved and identifying the most probable or highest-impact failures that can occur. Systems engineering involves finding solutions to these problems.

== History ==
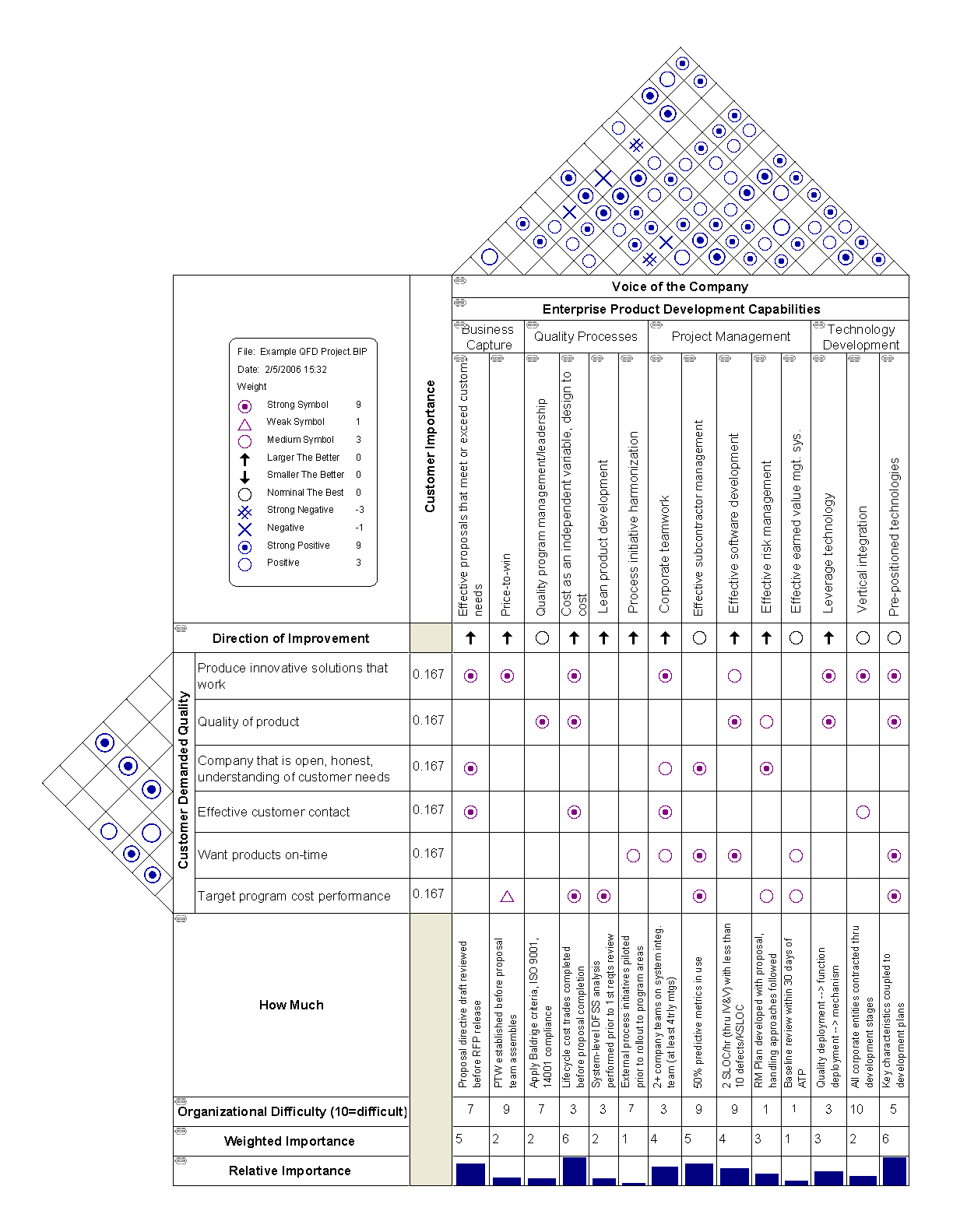
Quality function deployment (QFD) for enterprise product development processes

The term systems engineering can be traced back to Bell Telephone Laboratories in the 1940s. The need to identify and manipulate the properties of a system as a whole, which in complex engineering projects may greatly differ from the sum of the parts' properties, motivated various industries, especially those developing systems for the U.S. military, to apply the discipline.

When it was no longer possible to rely on design evolution to improve upon a system and the existing tools were not sufficient to meet growing demands, new methods began to be developed that addressed the complexity directly. The continuing evolution of systems engineering comprises the development and identification of new methods and modeling techniques. These methods aid in a better comprehension of the design and developmental control of engineering systems as they grow more complex. Popular tools that are often used in the systems engineering context were developed during these times, including Universal Systems Language (USL), Unified Modeling Language (UML), Quality function deployment (QFD), and Integration Definition (IDEF).

In 1990, a professional society for systems engineering, the National Council on Systems Engineering (NCOSE), was founded by representatives from a number of U.S. corporations and organizations. NCOSE was created to address the need for improvements in systems engineering practices and education. As a result of growing involvement from systems engineers outside of the U.S., the name of the organization was changed to the International Council on Systems Engineering (INCOSE) in 1995. Schools in several countries offer graduate programs in systems engineering, and continuing education options are also available for practicing engineers.

== Concept ==
Some definitions
Simon Ramo, considered by some to be a founder of modern systems engineering, defined the discipline as: "...a branch of engineering which concentrates on the design and application of the whole as distinct from the parts, looking at a problem in its entirety, taking account of all the facets and all the variables and linking the social to the technological." — Conquering Complexity, 2005.
"An interdisciplinary approach and means to enable the realization of successful systems" — INCOSE handbook, 2004.
"System engineering is a robust approach to the design, creation, and operation of systems. In simple terms, the approach consists of identification and quantification of system goals, creation of alternative system design concepts, performance of design trades, selection and implementation of the best design, verification that the design is properly built and integrated, and post-implementation assessment of how well the system meets (or met) the goals." — NASA Systems Engineering Handbook, 1995.
"The Art and Science of creating effective systems, using whole system, whole life principles" OR "The Art and Science of creating optimal solution systems to complex issues and problems" — Derek Hitchins, Prof. of Systems Engineering, former president of INCOSE (UK), 2007.
"The concept from the engineering standpoint is the evolution of the engineering scientist (i.e. the scientific generalist who maintains a broad outlook). The method is that of the team approach. On large-scale-system problems, teams of scientists and engineers, generalists as well as specialists, exert their joint efforts to find a solution and physically realize it...The technique has been variously called the systems approach or the team development method." — Harry H. Goode & Robert E. Machol, 1957.
"The systems engineering method recognizes each system is an integrated whole even though composed of diverse, specialized structures and sub-functions. It further recognizes that any system has a number of objectives and that the balance between them may differ widely from system to system. The methods seek to optimize the overall system functions according to the weighted objectives and to achieve maximum compatibility of its parts." — Systems Engineering Tools by Harold Chestnut, 1965.

Systems engineering signifies only an approach and, more recently, a discipline in engineering. The aim of education in systems engineering is to formalize various approaches simply and in doing so, identify new methods and research opportunities similar to that which occurs in other fields of engineering. As an approach, systems engineering is holistic and interdisciplinary in flavor.

=== Origins and traditional scope ===
The traditional scope of engineering embraces the conception, design, development, production, and operation of physical systems. Systems engineering, as originally conceived, falls within this scope. "Systems engineering", in this sense of the term, refers to the building of engineering concepts.

=== Evolution to a broader scope ===
The use of the term "systems engineer" has evolved over time to embrace a wider, more holistic concept of "systems" and of engineering processes. This evolution of the definition has been a subject of ongoing controversy, and the term continues to apply to both the narrower and broader scopes.

Traditional systems engineering was seen as a branch of engineering in the classical sense, that is, as applied only to physical systems, such as spacecraft and aircraft. More recently, systems engineering has evolved to take on a broader meaning, especially when humans are seen as an essential component of a system. Peter Checkland, for example, captures the broader meaning of systems engineering by stating that 'engineering' "can be read in its general sense; you can engineer a meeting or a political agreement."

Consistent with the broader scope of systems engineering, the Systems Engineering Body of Knowledge (SEBoK) has defined three types of systems engineering:

- Product Systems Engineering (PSE) is the traditional systems engineering focused on the design of physical systems consisting of hardware and software.
- Enterprise Systems Engineering (ESE) pertains to the view of enterprises, that is, organizations or combinations of organizations, as systems.
- Service Systems Engineering (SSE) has to do with the engineering of service systems. Checkland defines a service system as a system which is conceived as serving another system. Most civil infrastructure systems are service systems.

=== Holistic view ===
Systems engineering focuses on analyzing and eliciting customer needs and required functionality early in the development cycle, documenting requirements, then proceeding with design synthesis and system validation while considering the complete problem, the system lifecycle. This includes fully understanding all of the stakeholders involved. Oliver et al. claim that the systems engineering process can be decomposed into:

- A Systems Engineering Technical Process
- A Systems Engineering Management Process

Within Oliver's model, the goal of the Management Process is to organize the technical effort in the lifecycle, while the Technical Process includes assessing available information, defining effectiveness measures, to create a behavior model, create a structure model, perform trade-off analysis, and create sequential build & test plan.

Depending on their application, although there are several models that are used in the industry, all of them aim to identify the relation between the various stages mentioned above and incorporate feedback. Examples of such models include the Waterfall model and the VEE model (also called the V model).

=== Interdisciplinary field ===
System development often requires contribution from diverse technical disciplines. By providing a systems (holistic) view of the development effort, systems engineering helps mold all the technical contributors into a unified team effort, forming a structured development process that proceeds from concept to production to operation and, in some cases, to termination and disposal. In an acquisition, the holistic integrative discipline combines contributions and balances tradeoffs among cost, schedule, and performance while maintaining an acceptable level of risk covering the entire life cycle of the item.

This perspective is often replicated in educational programs, in that systems engineering courses are taught by faculty from other engineering departments, which helps create an interdisciplinary environment.

=== Managing complexity ===
The need for systems engineering arose with the increase in complexity of systems and projects, in turn exponentially increasing the possibility of component friction, and therefore the unreliability of the design. When speaking in this context, complexity incorporates not only engineering systems but also the logical human organization of data. At the same time, a system can become more complex due to an increase in size as well as with an increase in the amount of data, variables, or the number of fields that are involved in the design. The International Space Station is an example of such a system.

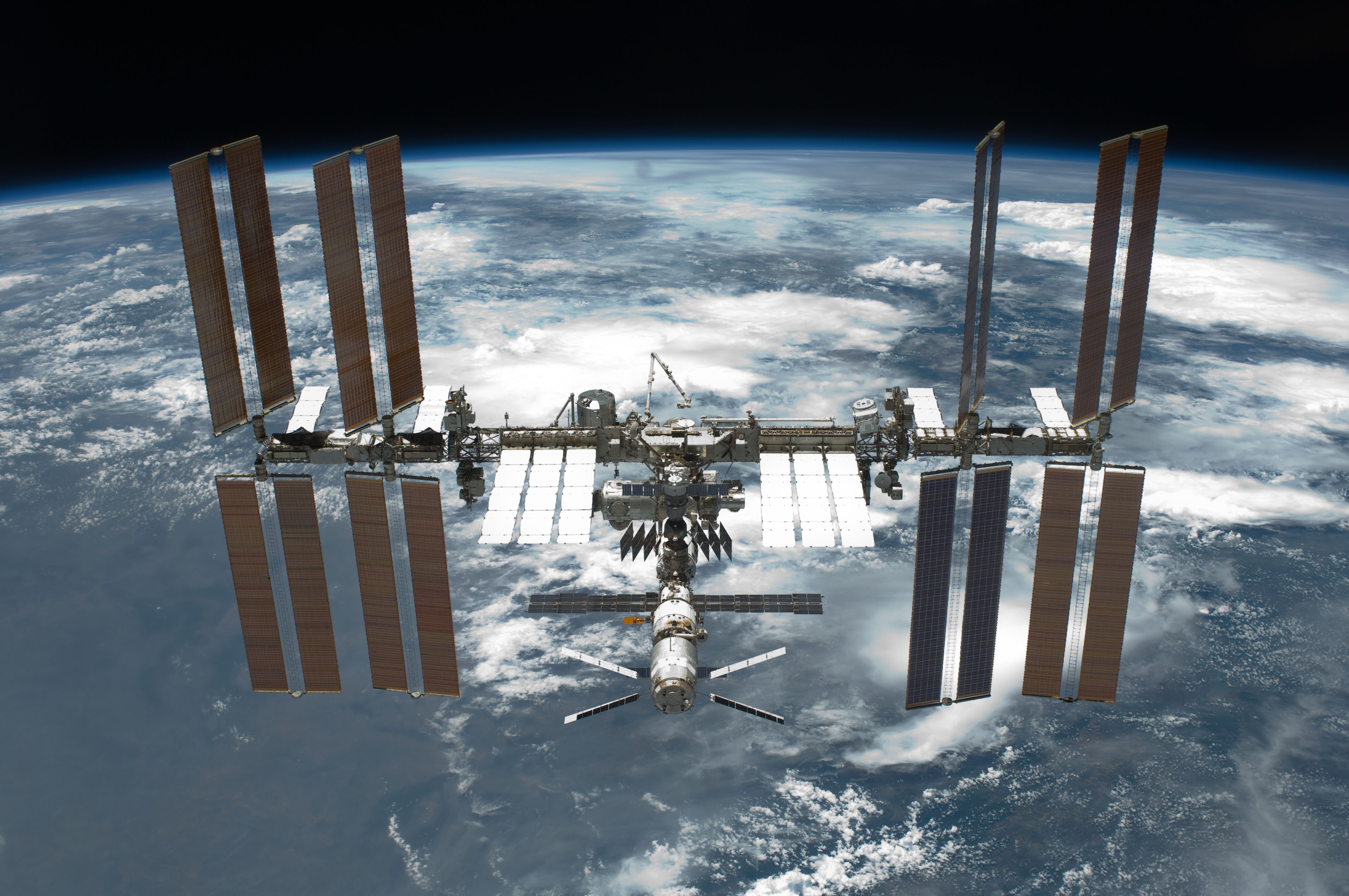
The International Space Station is an example of a very complex system requiring systems engineering.

The development of smarter control algorithms, microprocessor design, and analysis of environmental systems also come within the purview of systems engineering. Systems engineering encourages the use of tools and methods to better comprehend and manage complexity in systems. Some examples of these tools can be seen here:

- System architecture
- System model, modeling, and simulation
- Mathematical optimization
- System dynamics
- Systems analysis
- Statistical analysis
- Reliability engineering
- Decision making

Taking an interdisciplinary approach to engineering systems is inherently complex since the behavior of and interaction among system components is not always immediately well defined or understood. Defining and characterizing such systems and subsystems and the interactions among them is one of the goals of systems engineering. In doing so, the gap that exists between informal requirements from users, operators, marketing organizations, and technical specifications is successfully bridged.

=== Scope ===
The scope of systems engineering activities

The principles of systems engineering – holism, emergent behavior, boundary, et al. – can be applied to any system, complex or otherwise, provided systems thinking is employed at all levels. Besides defense and aerospace, many information and technology-based companies, software development firms, and industries in the field of electronics & communications require systems engineers as part of their team.

An analysis by the INCOSE Systems Engineering Center of Excellence (SECOE) indicates that optimal effort spent on systems engineering is about 15–20% of the total project effort. At the same time, studies have shown that systems engineering essentially leads to a reduction in costs among other benefits. However, no quantitative survey at a larger scale encompassing a wide variety of industries has been conducted until recently. Such studies are underway to determine the effectiveness and quantify the benefits of systems engineering.

Systems engineering encourages the use of modeling and simulation to validate assumptions or theories on systems and the interactions within them.

Use of methods that allow early detection of possible failures in safety engineering are integrated into the design process. At the same time, decisions made at the beginning of a project whose consequences are not clearly understood can have enormous implications later in the life of a system, and it is the task of the modern systems engineer to explore these issues and make critical decisions. No method guarantees today's decisions will still be valid when a system goes into service years or decades after first conceived. However, there are techniques that support the process of systems engineering. Examples include soft systems methodology, Jay Wright Forrester's System dynamics method, and the Unified Modeling Language (UML)—all currently being explored, evaluated, and developed to support the engineering decision process.

== Education ==
Education in systems engineering is often seen as an extension to the regular engineering courses, reflecting the industry attitude that engineering students need a foundational background in one of the traditional engineering disciplines (e.g. aerospace engineering, civil engineering, electrical engineering, mechanical engineering, manufacturing engineering, industrial engineering, chemical engineering)—plus practical, real-world experience to be effective as systems engineers. Undergraduate university programs explicitly in systems engineering are growing in number but remain uncommon, the degrees including such material are most often presented as a BS in Industrial Engineering. Typically, programs (either by themselves or in combination with interdisciplinary study) are offered beginning at the graduate level in both academic and professional tracks, resulting in the grant of either a MS/MEng or Ph.D./EngD degree.

INCOSE, in collaboration with the Systems Engineering Research Center at Stevens Institute of Technology, maintains a regularly updated directory of worldwide academic programs at suitably accredited institutions. As of 2017, it lists over 140 universities in North America offering more than 400 undergraduate and graduate programs in systems engineering. Widespread institutional acknowledgment of the field as a distinct subdiscipline is quite recent; the 2009 edition of the same publication reported the number of such schools and programs at only 80 and 165, respectively.

Education in systems engineering can be taken as systems-centric or domain-centric:

- Systems-centric programs treat systems engineering as a separate discipline and most of the courses are taught focusing on systems engineering principles and practice.
- Domain-centric programs offer systems engineering as an option that can be exercised with another major field in engineering.

Both of these patterns strive to educate the systems engineer who is able to oversee interdisciplinary projects with the depth required of a core engineer.

== Systems engineering topics ==
Systems engineering tools are strategies, procedures, and techniques that aid in performing systems engineering on a project or product. The purpose of these tools varies from database management, graphical browsing, simulation, and reasoning to document production, neutral import/export, and more.

=== System ===
There are many definitions of what a system is in the field of systems engineering. Below are a few authoritative definitions:

- ANSI/EIA-632-1999: "An aggregation of end products and enabling products to achieve a given purpose."
- DAU Systems Engineering Fundamentals: "an integrated composite of people, products, and processes that provide a capability to satisfy a stated need or objective."
- IEEE Std 1220-1998: "A set or arrangement of elements and processes that are related and whose behavior satisfies customer/operational needs and provides for life cycle sustainment of the products."
- INCOSE Systems Engineering Handbook: "homogeneous entity that exhibits predefined behavior in the real world and is composed of heterogeneous parts that do not individually exhibit that behavior and an integrated configuration of components and/or subsystems."
- INCOSE: "A system is a construct or collection of different elements that together produce results not obtainable by the elements alone. The elements, or parts, can include people, hardware, software, facilities, policies, and documents; that is, all things required to produce systems-level results. The results include system-level qualities, properties, characteristics, functions, behavior, and performance. The value added by the system as a whole, beyond that contributed independently by the parts, is primarily created by the relationship among the parts; that is, how they are interconnected."
- ISO/IEC 15288:2008: "A combination of interacting elements organized to achieve one or more stated purposes."
- NASA Systems Engineering Handbook: "(1) The combination of elements that function together to produce the capability to meet a need. The elements include all hardware, software, equipment, facilities, personnel, processes, and procedures needed for this purpose. (2) The end product (which performs operational functions) and enabling products (which provide life-cycle support services to the operational end products) that make up a system."

=== Systems engineering processes ===
Systems engineering processes encompass all creative, manual, and technical activities necessary to define the product and which need to be carried out to convert a system definition to a sufficiently detailed system design specification for product manufacture and deployment. Design and development of a system can be divided into four stages, each with different definitions:

- Task definition (informative definition)
- Conceptual stage (cardinal definition)
- Design stage (formative definition)
- Implementation stage (manufacturing definition)

Depending on their application, tools are used for various stages of the systems engineering process:

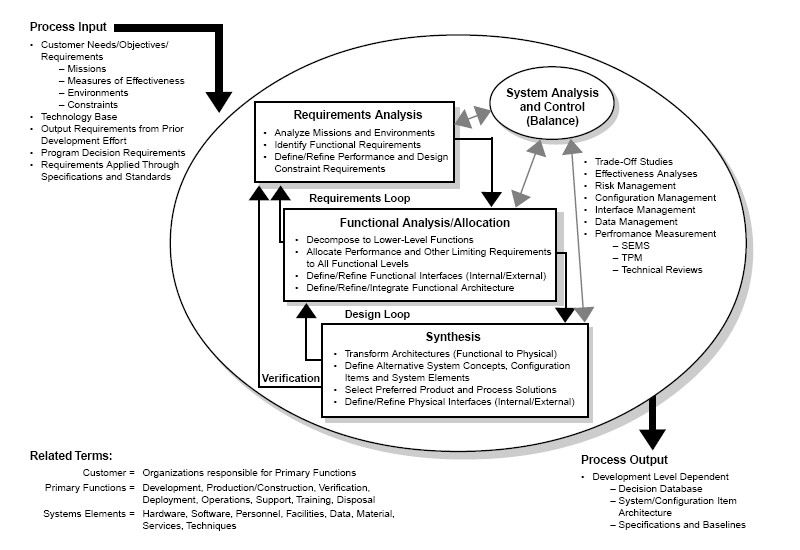

=== Using models ===
Models play important and diverse roles in systems engineering. A model can be defined in several ways, including:

- An abstraction of reality designed to answer specific questions about the real world
- An imitation, analog, or representation of a real-world process or structure; or
- A conceptual, mathematical, or physical tool to assist a decision-maker.

Together, these definitions are broad enough to encompass physical engineering models used in the verification of a system design, as well as schematic models like a functional flow block diagram and mathematical (i.e., quantitative) models used in the trade study process. This section focuses on the last.

The main reason for using mathematical models and diagrams in trade studies is to provide estimates of system effectiveness, performance or technical attributes, and cost from a set of known or estimable quantities. Typically, a collection of separate models is needed to provide all of these outcome variables. The heart of any mathematical model is a set of meaningful quantitative relationships among its inputs and outputs. These relationships can be as simple as adding up constituent quantities to obtain a total, or as complex as a set of differential equations describing the trajectory of a spacecraft in a gravitational field. Ideally, the relationships express causality, not just correlation. Furthermore, key to successful systems engineering activities are also the methods with which these models are efficiently and effectively managed and used to simulate the systems. However, diverse domains often present recurring problems of modeling and simulation for systems engineering, and new advancements are aiming to cross-fertilize methods among distinct scientific and engineering communities, under the title of 'Modeling & Simulation-based Systems Engineering'.

=== Modeling formalisms and graphical representations ===
Initially, when the primary purpose of a systems engineer is to comprehend a complex problem, graphic representations of a system are used to communicate a system's functional and data requirements. Common graphical representations include:

- Functional flow block diagram (FFBD)
- Model-based design
- Data-flow diagram (DFD)
- N2 chart
- IDEF0 diagram
- Use-case diagram
- Sequence diagram
- Block diagram
- Signal-flow graph
- USL function maps and type maps
- Enterprise architecture frameworks

A graphical representation relates the various subsystems or parts of a system through functions, data, or interfaces. Any or each of the above methods is used in an industry based on its requirements. For instance, the N2 chart may be used where interfaces between systems are important. Part of the design phase is to create structural and behavioral models of the system.

Once the requirements are understood, it is now the responsibility of a systems engineer to refine them and to determine, along with other engineers, the best technology for a job. At this point, starting with a trade study, systems engineering encourages the use of weighted choices to determine the best option. A decision matrix, or Pugh method, is one way (QFD is another) to make this choice while considering all criteria that are important. The trade study in turn informs the design, which again affects graphic representations of the system (without changing the requirements). In an SE process, this stage represents the iterative step that is carried out until a feasible solution is found. A decision matrix is often populated using techniques such as statistical analysis, reliability analysis, system dynamics (feedback control), and optimization methods.

=== Other tools ===
==== Systems Modeling Language ====
Systems Modeling Language (SysML), a modeling language used for systems engineering applications, supports the specification, analysis, design, verification and validation of a broad range of complex systems.

==== Lifecycle Modeling Language ====
Lifecycle Modeling Language (LML), is an open-standard modeling language designed for systems engineering that supports the full lifecycle: conceptual, utilization, support, and retirement stages.

== Related fields and sub-fields ==
Many related fields may be considered tightly coupled to systems engineering. The following areas have contributed to the development of systems engineering as a distinct entity:

=== Cognitive systems engineering ===
Cognitive systems engineering (CSE) is a specific approach to the description and analysis of human-machine systems or sociotechnical systems. The three main themes of CSE are how humans cope with complexity, how work is accomplished by the use of artifacts, and how human-machine systems and socio-technical systems can be described as joint cognitive systems. CSE has since its beginning become a recognized scientific discipline, sometimes also referred to as cognitive engineering. The concept of a Joint Cognitive System (JCS) has in particular become widely used as a way of understanding how complex socio-technical systems can be described with varying degrees of resolution. The more than 20 years of experience with CSE has been described extensively.

=== Configuration management ===
Like systems engineering, configuration management as practiced in the defense and aerospace industry is a broad systems-level practice. The field parallels the taskings of systems engineering; where systems engineering deals with requirements development, allocation to development items and verification, configuration management deals with requirements capture, traceability to the development item, and audit of development item to ensure that it has achieved the desired functionality and outcomes that systems engineering and/or Test and Verification Engineering have obtained and proven through objective testing.

=== Control engineering ===
Control engineering and its design and implementation of control systems, used extensively in nearly every industry, is a large sub-field of systems engineering. The cruise control on an automobile and the guidance system for a ballistic missile are two examples. Control systems theory is an active field of applied mathematics involving the investigation of solution spaces and the development of new methods for the analysis of the control process.

=== Industrial engineering ===
Industrial engineering is a branch of engineering that concerns the development, improvement, implementation, and evaluation of integrated systems of people, money, knowledge, information, equipment, energy, material, and process. Industrial engineering draws upon the principles and methods of engineering analysis and synthesis, as well as mathematical, physical, and social sciences, together with the principles and methods of engineering analysis and design to specify, predict, and evaluate results obtained from such systems.

=== Production Systems Engineering ===
Production Systems Engineering (PSE) is an emerging branch of engineering intended to uncover fundamental principles of production systems and utilize them for analysis, continuous improvement, and design.

=== Interface design ===
Interface design and its specification are concerned with assuring that the pieces of a system connect and interoperate with other parts of the system and with external systems as necessary. Interface design also includes assuring that system interfaces are able to accept new features, including mechanical, electrical, and logical interfaces, including reserved wires, plug-space, command codes, and bits in communication protocols. This is known as extensibility. Human-Computer Interaction (HCI) or Human-Machine Interface (HMI) is another aspect of interface design and is a critical aspect of modern systems engineering. Systems engineering principles are applied in the design of communication protocols for local area networks and wide area networks.

=== Mechatronic engineering ===
Mechatronic engineering, like systems engineering, is a multidisciplinary field of engineering that uses dynamic systems modeling to express tangible constructs. In that regard, it is almost indistinguishable from systems engineering, but what sets it apart is the focus on smaller details rather than larger generalizations and relationships. As such, both fields are distinguished by the scope of their projects rather than the methodology of their practice.

=== Operations research ===
Operations research supports systems engineering. Operations research, briefly, is concerned with the optimization of a process under multiple constraints.

=== Performance engineering ===
Performance engineering is the discipline of ensuring a system meets customer expectations for performance throughout its life. Performance is usually defined as the speed with which a certain operation is executed or the capability of executing a number of such operations in a unit of time. Performance may be degraded when operations queued to execute are throttled by limited system capacity. For example, the performance of a packet-switched network is characterized by the end-to-end packet transit delay or the number of packets switched in an hour. The design of high-performance systems uses analytical or simulation modeling, whereas the delivery of high-performance implementation involves thorough performance testing. Performance engineering relies heavily on statistics, queueing theory, and probability theory for its tools and processes.

=== Program management and project management ===
Program management (or project management) has many similarities with systems engineering, but has broader-based origins than the engineering ones of systems engineering. Project management is also closely related to both program management and systems engineering. Both include scheduling as an engineering support tool in assessing interdisciplinary concerns under the management process. In particular, the direct relationship of resources, performance features, and risk to the duration of a task or the dependency links among tasks and impacts across the system lifecycle are systems engineering concerns.

=== Proposal engineering ===
Proposal engineering is the application of scientific and mathematical principles to design, construct, and operate a cost-effective proposal development system. Basically, proposal engineering uses the "systems engineering process" to create a cost-effective proposal and increase the odds of a successful proposal.

=== Reliability engineering ===
Reliability engineering is the discipline of ensuring a system meets customer expectations for reliability throughout its life (i.e., it does not fail more frequently than expected). Next to the prediction of failure, it is just as much about the prevention of failure. Reliability engineering applies to all aspects of the system. It is closely associated with maintainability, availability (dependability or RAMS preferred by some), and integrated logistics support. Reliability engineering is always a critical component of safety engineering, as in failure mode and effects analysis (FMEA) and hazard fault tree analysis, and of security engineering.

=== Risk management ===
Risk management, the practice of assessing and dealing with risk, is one of the interdisciplinary parts of systems engineering. In development, acquisition, or operational activities, the inclusion of risk in tradeoffs with cost, schedule, and performance features involves the iterative, complex configuration management of traceability and evaluation to the scheduling and requirements management across domains and for the system lifecycle that requires the interdisciplinary technical approach of systems engineering. Systems engineering has risk management define, tailor, implement, and monitor a structured process for risk management which is integrated into the overall effort.

=== Safety engineering ===
The techniques of safety engineering may be applied by non-specialist engineers in designing complex systems to minimize the probability of safety-critical failures. The "System Safety Engineering" function helps to identify "safety hazards" in emerging designs and may assist with techniques to "mitigate" the effects of (potentially) hazardous conditions that cannot be designed out of systems.

=== Security engineering ===
Security engineering can be viewed as an interdisciplinary field that integrates the community of practice for control systems design, reliability, safety, and systems engineering. It may involve such sub-specialties as authentication of system users, system targets, and others: people, objects, and processes.

=== Software engineering ===
From its beginnings, software engineering has helped shape modern systems engineering practice. The techniques used in the handling of the complexities of large software-intensive systems have had a major effect on the shaping and reshaping of the tools, methods, and processes of systems engineering.

== See also ==
- Arcadia (engineering)
- Control engineering
- Design review (U.S. government)
- Engineering management
- Engineering information management
- Enterprise systems engineering
- Industrial engineering
- Interdisciplinarity
- International Conference on Systems Engineering
- Life-cycle engineering
- List of production topics
- List of requirements engineering tools
- List of systems engineers
- List of types of systems engineering
- Management cybernetics
- Model-based systems engineering
- Operations management
- Structured systems analysis and design method
- System of systems engineering (SoSE)
- System accident
- Systems architecture
- Systems development life cycle
- Systems thinking (e.g. theory of constraints, value-stream mapping)
- System information modelling
- Tricotyledon theory of system design
