= Engineering cybernetics =

Branch of cybernetics

Engineering cybernetics, also known as technical cybernetics or cybernetic engineering, is the branch of cybernetics concerned with applications in engineering, in fields such as control engineering and robotics.

== History ==
Qian Xuesen (Hsue-Shen Tsien) defined engineering cybernetics as a theoretical field of "engineering science", the purpose of which is to "study those parts of the broad science of cybernetics which have direct engineering applications in designing controlled or guided systems". Published in 1954, Qian's published work "Engineering Cybernetics" describes the mathematical and engineering concepts of cybernetic ideas as understood at the time, breaking them down into granular scientific concepts for application. Qian's work is notable for going beyond model-based theories and arguing for the necessity of a new design principle for types of system the properties and characteristics of which are largely unknown.

In the 2020s, concerns with the social consequences of cyber-physical systems, have led to calls to develop "a new branch of engineering", "drawing on the history of cybernetics and reimagining it for our 21st century challenges".

== Popular usage ==
1960's - An example of engineering cybernetics is a device designed in the mid-1960s by General Electric Company. Referred to as a CAM (cybernetic anthropomorphous machine), this machine was designed for use by the US Army ground troops. Operated by one man in a "cockpit" at the front end, the machine's "legs" steps were duplicates of the leg movements of the harnessed operator.

A common use includes the treatment of neurological disorders with the purposeful application of neuromuscular electrical stimulation (NMES), or more precisely the use of functional electrical stimulation (FES). The most common used therapy is the 1980s introduced FES-cycling methods. Additional research is attempting to implement applications from control systems to improve FES-cycling. New research is being conducted using computer-controlled FES, where the musculoskeletal system is viewed as cybernetic system.

== In Media ==
1990's - Neon Genesis Evangelion the Japanese animation (anime) TV series featured giant robots piloted by humans that had a connection to the host machine via biological impulses.

== See also ==
- Autonomous agency theory
- Biological system
- Complex systems
- Control Theory
- Cybernetics Society
- Gaia hypothesis
- Industrial ecology
- Principia Cybernetica
- Ratio Club
- Superorganisms
- Synergetics (Haken)
- Tektology
- Variety (cybernetics)
- Viable system theory
  - Viable system model
  - Viable systems approach
