= Viability =

Viability or viable may refer to:

== Biology, medicine or ecology ==
- Viability selection, the selection of individual organisms who can survive until they are able to reproduce
- Fetal viability, the ability of a fetus to survive outside of the uterus
- Genetic viability, chance of a population of plants or animals to avoid the problems of inbreeding
- Minimum viable population, a lower bound on the population of a species, such that it can survive in the wild
- Population viability analysis, a species-specific method of risk assessment frequently used in conservation biology
- Viable count, of viable cells

== Business ==
- Viability study, a study of the profitability of a business concept which is to be converted into a business
- Minimum viable product, in product development, a strategy used for fast and quantitative market testing of a product or product feature

== Other uses ==
- Viable Paradise, an annual one-week writing workshop held each autumn on Martha's Vineyard
- Viable system model, a scientific model by Stafford Beer of the organization of a viable or autonomous system
- Viable system theory, a modelling approach that enables complex strategic and operative business and financial systems to be modelled and explored.
- Viability theory, an area of mathematics that studies the evolution of dynamical systems under constraints to the system's state

== See also ==
- Viability assay, an assay to determine the ability of cells or tissues to maintain or recover its viability
- Via (disambiguation)
