= Feedforward (disambiguation) =

Feedforward is the provision of context of what one wants to communicate prior to that communication.

Feedforward may also refer to:

- Feedforward (behavioral and cognitive science), the concept of learning from the future and one's desired behavior
- Feed forward (control), a type of element or pathway within a control system
- Feedforward (management), giving a pre-feedback to a person or an organization from which you are expecting a feedback
- Feedforward neural network, a type of artificial neural network
