= Macrostructure =

Macrostructure may refer to:

- Macrostrucure (engineering)
- Macrostructure (linguistics)
- Macrostructure (psychology)
- Macrostructure (sociology)

== See also ==
- Microstructure
