= Global Peter Drucker Forum =

The Global Peter Drucker Forum is an international management conference dedicated to the management philosophy of Peter Drucker. Drucker, who lived from 1909 to 2005, was a management professor, writer, and consultant, frequently referred to as a "management guru". The Forum is held annually in November, in Drucker's home town of Vienna, Austria. It is organized by Richard Straub, the founder and president of the Global Peter Drucker Forum and the Peter Drucker Society Europe, which is an affiliate of the Drucker Institute at Claremont Graduate University.

== Editions ==
The first Global Peter Drucker Forum was held on 19 November 2009, marking what would have been the 100th birthday of Peter Drucker. The forum included presentations by management philosopher and author Charles Handy, Kellogg School of Management professor Philip Kotler, economist Peter Lorange, economist and consultant Fredmund Malik, C.K. Prahalad of the Stephen M. Ross School of Business and Simon-Kucher chairman Hermann Simon.

Drucker's widow, Doris, supported the forum prior to her death in 2014.

| Year | Dates | Theme | Venue |
|---|---|---|---|
| 2009 | 19–20 November | | Haus der Industrie |
| 2010 | 18–19 November | | Liechtenstein Palace |
| 2011 | 3–4 November | A Quest for Legitimacy: How Managers Can Shape the Future | Vienna University |
| 2012 | 15–16 November | Capitalism 2.0: New Horizons for Managers | Aula der Wissenschaften |
| 2013 | | Managing Complexity | |
| 2014 | | The Great Transformation – Managing Our Way to Prosperity | |
| 2015 | | Claiming Our Humanity – Managing in the Digital Age | |
| 2016 | | The Entrepreneurial Society – Moving Beyond a Society of Employees | |
| 2017 | 16–17 November | Growth & Inclusive Prosperity – The Secular Management Challenge | |
| 2018 | 29–30 November | Management: The Human Dimension | Hofburg |

== Peter Drucker Challenge ==
The Peter Drucker Challenge was added to the Forum in 2010. The challenge is an essay competition open to young business leaders. The topic of the challenge changes annually but is related to the works of Peter Drucker.

=== 2019 Challenge ===
The 2019 Peter Drucker Challenge concerned the "Value of the Renaissance Manager," explicitly linked to the 500th anniversary of the passing of Leonardo Da Vinci. The Jury was composed of Stephan Güldenberg, Piero Formica, Delphine Jumelle-Paulet, and Julia Kirby.

=== 2011 Challenge ===
The 2011 Peter Drucker Challenge focused on the topic of, "management, what is it good for?". The competition closed in August and the winners were announced by Peter Drucker Society Europe. Jury was composed of Deepa Prahalad, John Peters and Elizabeth Haas Edersheim.

=== 2010 Challenge ===
The 2010 Peter Drucker Challenge received 214 entries. The competition was judged by Danica Purg, who was named "Dean of the year" by the Academy for International Business, chief executive for Emerald Group Publishing John Peters and author Elizabeth Haas-Edersheim. The judges selected 12 top essayists, with first place going to Florian Ramseger.
