= Glenda Eoyang =

Glenda Eoyang is a pioneer in the applications of complexity science to human and organizational systems, and developed the concept of human systems dynamics (HSD) based on her theoretical and practical research.

The model rests on three conditions that influence the path, speed, and outcomes of self-organizing processes in complex adaptive systems. These conditions are necessary and sufficient to create patterns that emerge and can be perceived in all kinds of complex adaptive systems. Depending on the interactions of those conditions, the emergence process and its outcomes can be fast or slow, direct or meandering, and ambiguous or clear. The same conditions can be intentionally changed to influence the current situation and emerging future patterns of the system. The three conditions are therefore described as the Eoyang CDE Model.

== Eoyang CDE Model ==
- C: Container. Any feature of the system that holds agents together until system-wide patterns form can function as a system container. Large or loose containers lead to slow and ambiguous self-organizing processes. Small, tight containers set conditions for faster and clearer emergence. Examples of containers include physical containers: rooms, buildings, geographic areas, etc. Psychological or contextual containers include relationships, charismatic leaders, ideology, shared beliefs, etc. Organizational or structural containers include departments and offices—even agendas can be containers.
- D: Difference. Diversity or energy that is important to the system can help to shape patterns. Few or small differences contribute to slow and subtle pattern formation. Many or large differences may contribute to disruptions that are apparently random. Differences that are few in number, but significant in size, are most likely to generate patterns that are timely and clear.
- E: Exchange. The connections that transfer energy, information, or resources across differences within a container are considered to be exchanges. Tight exchanges create fast and predictable changes, while loose exchanges set conditions for slow and unpredictable change. Examples include: speaking and listening, feedback and data, money exchanges, shared event or opportunities, etc.

In 2003, Eoyang founded The Human Systems Dynamics Institute (HSDI) to develop the theory and practice of human systems dynamic. As a not-for-profit organization (501c3) located in the US, the institute invests in research and education around the globe to help individuals and organizations cope with complexity and uncertainty.
