= Management cybernetics =

Application of cybernetics to management and organizations

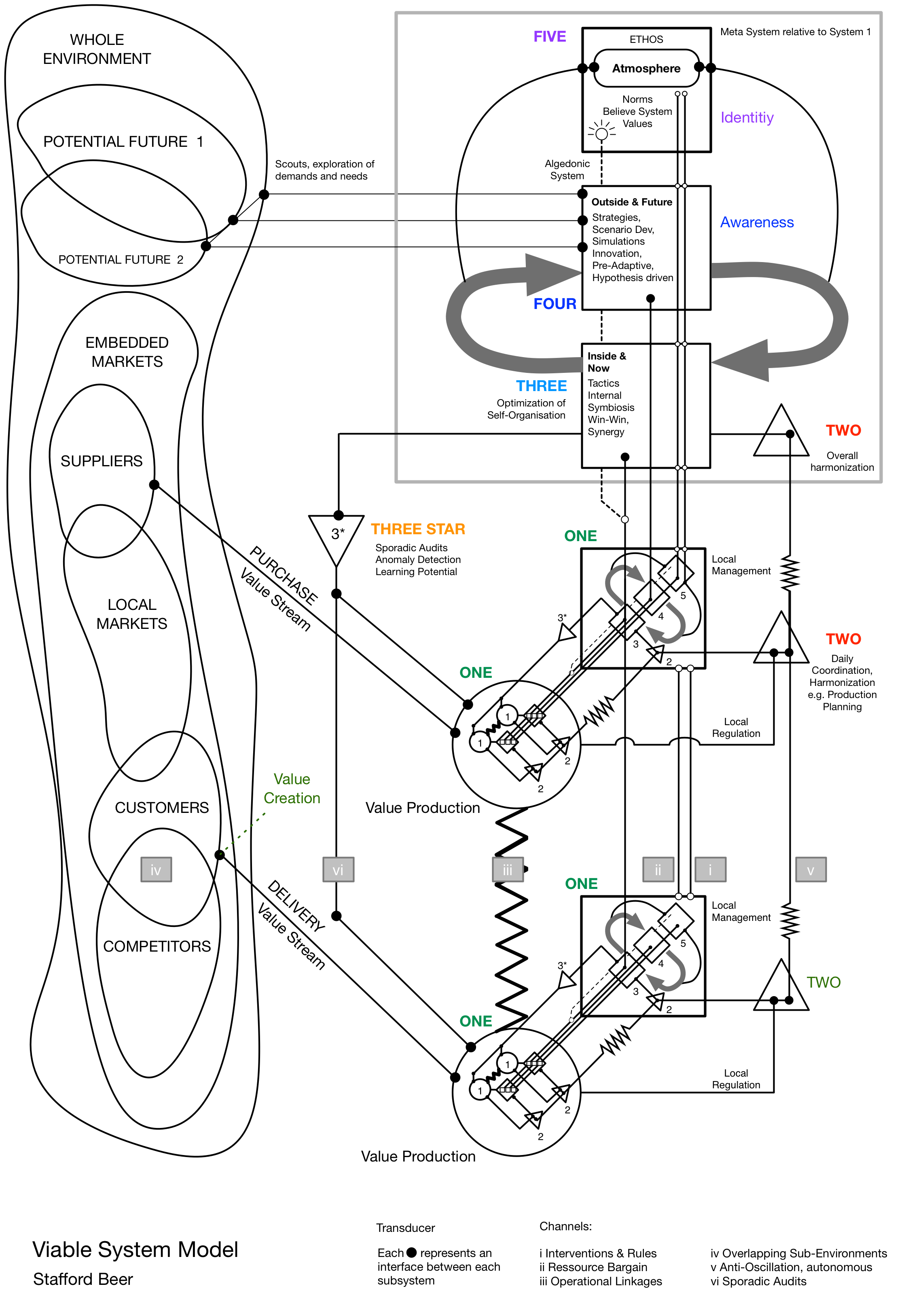
The viable system model (VSM) by Stafford Beer.

Management cybernetics is concerned with the application of cybernetics to management and organizations. "Management cybernetics" was first introduced by Stafford Beer in the late 1950s and introduces the various mechanisms of self-regulation applied by and to organizational settings, as seen through a cybernetics perspective. Beer developed the theory through a combination of practical applications and a series of influential books. The practical applications involved steel production, publishing and operations research in a large variety of different industries. Some consider that the full flowering of management cybernetics is represented in Beer's books. However, learning continues (see below).

== Research into operations ==
As practiced by Beer, research into operations involved multidisciplinary teams seeking practical assistance for difficult managerial issues. It often involved the development of models borrowed from basic sciences and put into isomorphic relationship with an organizational situation. Beer initially called this "operations research" (OR) but, along with Russell Ackoff, became increasingly disenchanted with that term as the field transitioned into one in which a predefined set of mathematical tools was applied to well-formulated problems. Beer's critique of traditional OR, in part, was that it became a matter of experts in mathematics looking for situations that could be conformed to their methods. Beer insisted that what was needed for effective research into operations was to first understand the key dynamics within the situation and only then to select the theory or methods that would allow one to understand that situation in detail. Beer's "Decision and Control", especially chapter six, discusses the methodology in some detail.

== Viable system model (VSM) ==
Viable means capable of independent existence and implies both maintaining internal stability and adaptation to a changing environment. "Internal stability" and "adaptation" can be in conflict, particularly if the relevant environment is changing rapidly, so the viable system model (VSM) is about maintaining a balance between the two such that the system is able to survive.

The VSM is a model of the structures and functions that are both necessary and sufficient for the long-term survival of a system in a changing environment. Allenna Leonard, Beer's longtime partner, suggested that the most useful way to think about the VSM is as a language. The VSM is a language of viability. The VSM is a language for diagnosing organizations and managerial teams in terms of their viability or lack thereof. The VSM is also a language for designing organizations and managerial teams that will be viable.

== Syntegration ==
One of the great difficulties in managing the modern large organization is that many of the issues are far too complex for even small groups. The critical knowledge is often dispersed among a substantial number of people. Organizations are often faced with choosing between 1) very costly and time-consuming meetings of large groups or 2) making bad decisions based on an inadequate grasp of the relevant factors. Integration is a group method designed to solve this conundrum.

Integration melds a number of cybernetic principles with Buckminster Fuller's ideas on tensegrity. The initial "team syntegrity" format involved 30 people divided into 12 overlapping teams to deal with some broad and initially ill-defined issues. The teams and roles within the teams are arranged to achieve the mathematically optimum degree of resonance of information throughout the entire group. In practice, integration achieves a remarkable degree of shared understanding of the initial issue. In integrations intended to develop a plan of action, the implementation phase is usually very quick and effective, probably because of the shared understanding developed among the participants.

== Learning and development ==
The literature on management cybernetics is extensive. The Cybernetics Society supports learning and its journal and its archives and journal Kybernetes contain related material. The American Society for Cybernetics offer suggested reading and materials. Beer wrote many papers and about six key books. Others have contributed perhaps an equal amount. Barry Clemson, at Beer's urging, wrote an introduction to management and organizational cybernetics. Patrick Hoverstadt wrote an introduction using real-life examples. J.D. Espejo and Reyes describe the management of complexity using VSM from a systemic theory perspective. Stewart described the ternary analysis of work and working organisations based on a cybernetic three-fold ontology of action and systems formation. Fredmund Malik wrote an extensive series of books applying management cybernetics to business strategy, governance, and financial control, relating it also to Peter Drucker (whose management by objectives was influenced by Russell Ackoff and the Macy Conferences). Angus Jenkinson related cybernetics to identity, Service-dominant logic, Goethean science of metamorphosis, and imparity in ternary theory in describing the cybernetics of organisation structure.

== Organizational cybernetics ==
Organizational cybernetics (OC) is sometimes distinguished from management cybernetics. Both use many of the same terms and draw on some of the same source but are said to interpret them according to slightly different philosophies of systems thinking.

Organizational cybernetics studies organizational design, and the regulation and self-regulation of organizations from a systems theory perspective also drawing on Beer and cybernetics, but also takes the social dimension into consideration. Extending the principles of autonomous agency theory (AAT), cultural agency theory (CAT) has been formulated for the generation of higher cybernetic orders.

Researchers in economics, public administration and political science focus on the changes in institutions, organisation and mechanisms of social steering at various levels (sub-national, national, European, international) and in different sectors (including the private, semi-private and public sectors; the latter sector is emphasised).

There is also an extensive related field also growing out of General systems theory and cybernetics via Autopoiesis, the biological theory of Humberto Maturana and Francisco Varela influencing Niklas Luhmann, and research by complexity and systems theory scholars. In this context, the term autopoiesis could be likened to the principle of reproducibility in organizational outcomes.

== See also ==
- Autonomous agency theory
- Cynefin
- Government by algorithm
- Gregory Bateson
- Institut für Unternehmenskybernetik
- Management science
- New cybernetics
- Organizational studies
- Outline of management
- Project Cybersyn
- Strength-based practice
- Viable system theory
- Warren McCulloch
