= Fredmund Malik =

Austrian economist

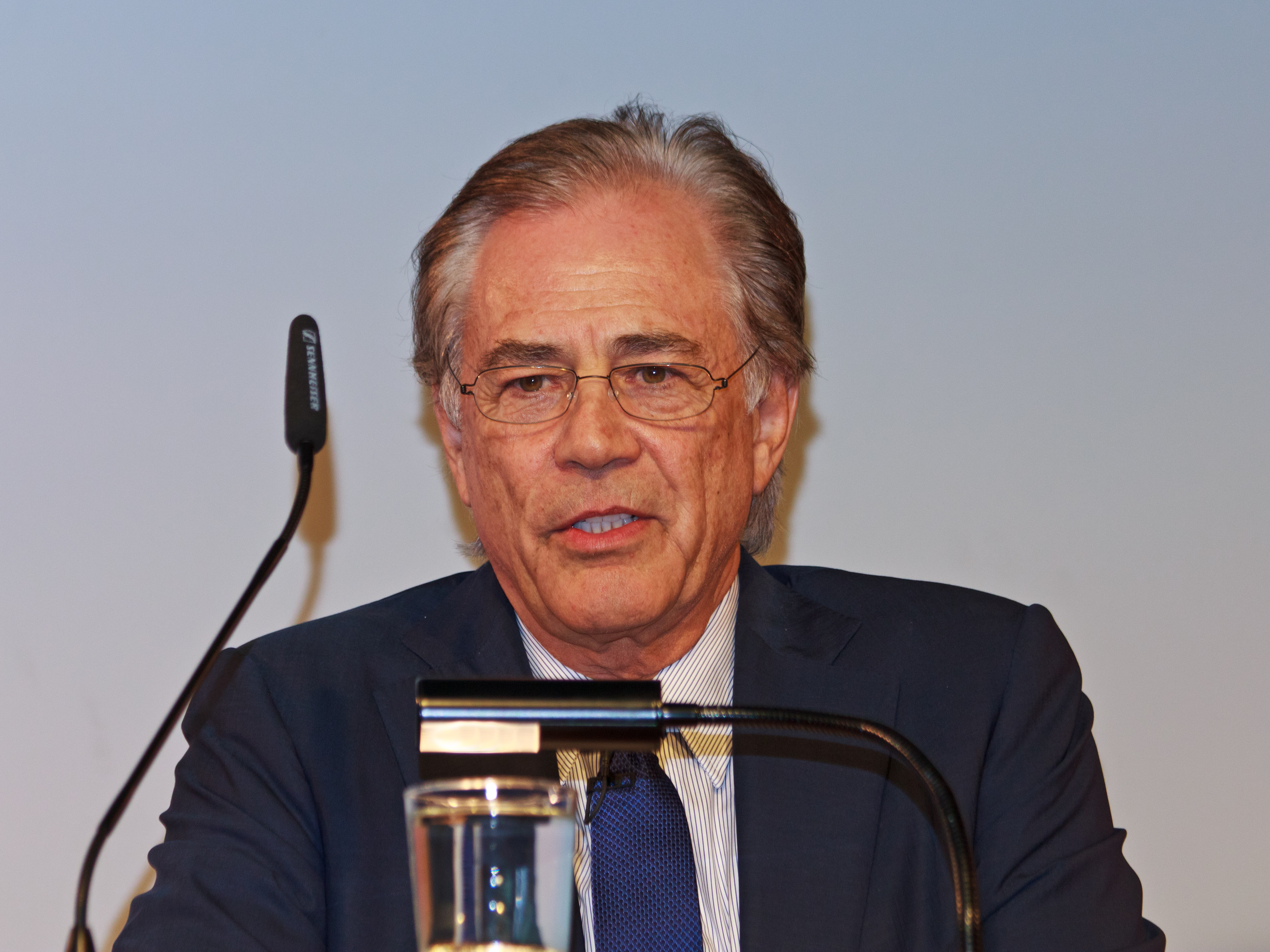
- Born: 1 September 1944 (age 81); Lustenau, Tyrol-Vorarlberg, Germany
- Education: University of St. Gallen
- Occupations: Professor, Management consultant
- Awards: 2009 Cross of Honor for Science and Art of the Republic of Austria for his Wholistic Management Systems, 2010 Heinz von Foerster-Award for Organizational Cybernetics by the German Association for Cybernetics, 2016 The People's Republic of China Friendship Award

Fredmund Malik (born 1 September 1944) is an Austrian economist with focus on management science and the founder and chairman of a management consultancy (Malik Management) in St. Gallen.

Malik applies systems theory and cybernetics to analyse and design management systems. From 1974 to 2004 he was teaching at the University of St. Gallen, where he is titular professor for general management, leadership and governance.

== Biography ==
Malik studied economics, social sciences, logic and philosophy of science at the universities of Innsbruck and St. Gallen. In 1968 he enrolled at the University of Innsbruck and in 1970 he changed to the University of St. Gallen. He earned his doctoral degree in 1975 at the University of St. Gallen, where he habilitated in 1978 for managerial economics. From 1978 to 1986, he was associate professor for managerial economics at the University of St. Gallen. From 1979 to 1984 he was also member of the board of the School of Management at University of St. Gallen. For many years, he worked closely with Hans Ulrich, the founder of the St. Gallen Management Model. From 1981 to 1982 he was guest professor at the University of Innsbruck. In 1986 he was appointed titular professor at University of St. Gallen. From 1992 to 1997 he was guest professor at the Vienna University of Economics and Business. Since 1977 he is also chairman of the Management Zentrum St. Gallen.He is a member of the European Academy of Sciences and Arts and in 2009 he was awarded the Austrian Decoration for Science and Art.

In January 2010 he received the Heinz-von-Foerster Price at the University of Hagen for organizations- cybernetics. On September 30, 2016 he was honored with the "People's Republic of China Friendship Award" by China's Prime Minister Li Keqiang. The Award is China's highest honor for foreign experts who contribute to China's economic and social development.

Malik analyses complexity by applying management cybernetics in an interdisciplinary combination of methods and on the basis of different philosophies of science.

Malik is author of numerous writings on management theory, general management, strategy and human resource development. He is regarded as a generalist and besides his theoretical background, he gained practical experience as management consultant, management educator and entrepreneur, and as member and chairman of several supervisory bodies. In particular, he aims at effective management action and applies cybernetics to management practice.

From his wholistic, system-oriented standpoint, he criticizes pure shareholder value orientation and education programs in business administration that in his opinion mostly teach too limited views on economics and management. He argues that applying the laws, models and methods of management cybernetics, enables an organization to function more effective- and efficiently. With this knowledge of cybernetics applied in any societal organization including the political sphere, he asserts that a “New World of Functioning” can be achieved that will benefit all society.

From 1984 on Malik is an Austrian honorary consul in Switzerland for the cantons of Appenzell Ausserrhoden, Appenzell Innerrhoden and St. Gallen.

== Awards and Honorary positions ==
Malik is a jury member of the "Top 100" award for the most innovative companies of the German Mittelstand. With practical and theoretical expert knowledge, he decides which company is awarded "Innovator of the Year".

Malik is member of the European Academy of Sciences and Arts.

He is member of the advisory board of the European Peter F. Drucker Society.

Since 2009 he is recipient of the Austrian Cross of Honour for Science and Art.

In January 2010 he was awarded the "Heinz von Foerster Prize" for organizational cybernetics at the University of Hagen.

In September 2016 Malik received the "People's Republic of China Friendship Award" from the Central Government of China. It is the highest award the Chinese government grants to "foreign experts who have made outstanding contributions to the country's economic and social progress".

In 2020 he was awarded an Honorary Fellowship of the Cybernetics Society.

== Selected works ==
- Navigating into the Unknown: A new way for management, governance and leadership, 2016, in English, Campus Verlag, Frankfurt/New York, ISBN 978-3-593-50582-4
- Series: Management: Mastering Complexity:
  - Volume 1: Management: The essence of the craft, 2010, in English, Campus Verlag, Frankfurt/New York, ISBN 978-3-593-39129-8
  - Volume 2: Corporate Policy and Corporate Governance, 2011, ISBN 978-3-593-39545-6
  - Volume 3: Strategy: Navigating the Complexity of the New World, 2016, ISBN 978-3-593-50611-1
- Uncluttered Management Thinking: 46 Concepts for Masterful Management, 2011, in English, ISBN 978-3-593-39365-0
- Managing Performing Living: Effective Management for a New Era, 2015, in English, ISBN 978-3-593-50263-2
- Effective Top Management: Beyond the Failure of Corporate Governance and Shareholder Value, 2006, in English, ISBN 978-3-527-50117-5
- The New Corporate Governance, in German
- Systemic Management, Evolution, Self-organisation, new edition 2009, in German, ISBN 978-3-258-07494-8
- Strategy of the Management of Complex Systems (Habilitation), new edition 2008, in German, ISBN 978-3-258-07396-5
- Management-Systems, in German
- Danger of Crisis in the World Economy, in German (with Daniel Stelter)
- Praxis of System-orientiented Management, in German (Editor)
- Systemmethodoligy, in German (Doctoral Dissertation, with Peter Gomez and Karl-Heinz Oeller)
- System-orientiented Management, in German (Editor, with Bénédict Hentsch)
