= Danica Purg =

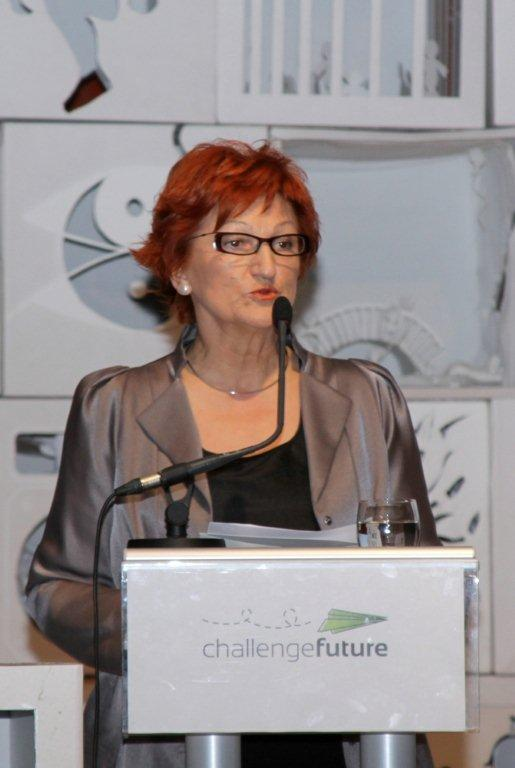
Danica Purg

Danica Purg is the founding and current President of the IEDC-Bled School of Management, Slovenia, and the founding President of the Central and East European Management Development Association (CEEMAN), which has 211 members from 53 countries and whose aim is to enhance management development in Central and Eastern Europe. She is also chairperson and director of the European Leadership Centre (ELC), established with the aim of assessing and promoting European leadership through the organization of forums, workshops and research.

Purg has been selected the 2010 Dean of the Year Award by the Academy of International Business (AIB) for her outstanding achievements in international business education.

Purg is professor of leadership and effective management at the IEDC-Bled School of Management. Her special field of interest is looking for inspirations for managers from art and other professions.

She has authored and co-authored several books and numerous articles on technological and organizational change, comparative HRM practices, team building, economic reforms and management development in Central and Eastern Europe (published in Slovenia, former Yugoslavia, the Netherlands, Germany, Japan, Russia, Great Britain and USA). In 2003 Purg edited and co-authored the book Leaders and Teams – The Winning Partnership.

Purg is Fellow of the International Academy of Management, Doctor Honoris Causa at Moscow State University of Management and Estonian Business School, and honorary professor at Moscow International Higher Business School (MIRBIS). President of the Republic of Slovenia awarded her with the "Honorary Order of Freedom" for her contribution to management development in Slovenia and CEE.

Purg is also member of several advisory boards, among them of the Advisory Board of Women’s Forum for the Economy and Society, Advisory Board of BAWB (Business as an Agent of World Benefit Global Forum) and Advisory Board of the newly established Moscow School of Management SKOLKOVO. Purg is also Member of the exclusive European Cultural Parliament (ECP) - a forum for outstanding artists, thinkers and other cultural personalities from all Europe. Recently she was invited to become a member of the UN Global Compact Taskforce to develop the principles for Responsible Business Education and in 2007 she became President of UN Global Compact Slovenia.

After graduating from the Faculty of Political Science in Ljubljana, she completed her PhD at the University of Belgrade's Faculty of Political Science, and extensively studied at Harvard Business School, IMD Lausanne, INSEAD Fontainebleau, Technological University Delft, the University of London, Sorbonne and at Kalamazoo College, Michigan.
