= Haneef Fatmi =

Pakistani engineer (1933–1995)

Haneef Akhtar Fatmi (1933–1995) was a Pakistani engineer specializing in cybernetics. He was born in Bhopal State and took a degree in Electrical Engineering at Karachi University (1951). While studying with Dennis Gabor and Abdus Salam at Imperial College he wrote his doctorate on ionized gases. Whilst at the London University, he helped found the Cybernetics Society.

In 1970 Fatmi, with Young, published a definition of intelligence in the journal Nature, that subject to widespread comments and notability being listed by the Institute of Physics as "one of the 2000 leading quotations of all times". That definition is that: "Intelligence is that faculty, of mind, by which order is perceived in a situation previously considered disordered". (H. A. Fatmi & R. W. Young, "A Definition of Intelligence", Nature 228, 97 (1970)) This definition is addressed directly in the Oxford Companion to the Mind.

== Selected publications ==
- Gabor, D. and Fatmi, H.A., "A thermionic generator," Nature, London, 1961, 868.
- Gabor, D. and Fatmi, H.A., "The theory of gas discharges with extraneous ion supply," Advanced Energy Conversion, IEE, London, 1964, 307.
- Fatmi, H.A. and Young, R.W., "A definition of intelligence," Nature, London, 1970, 97.
- Fatmi, H.A., "The concept of a creative society," Electronics and power, IEE London, 1974
- Fatmi, H.A., Resconi, G. A new computing principle. Nuov Cim B 101, 239–242 (1988). https://doi.org/10.1007/BF02828704
