= Complex adaptive system =

System whose behavior is not automatically predictable from its parts

A complex adaptive system (CAS) is a system that is complex in that it is a dynamic network of interactions, but the behavior of the ensemble may not be predictable according to the behavior of the components. It is adaptive in that the individual and collective behavior mutate and self-organize corresponding to the change-initiating micro-event or collection of events. It is a "complex macroscopic collection" of relatively "similar and partially connected micro-structures" formed in order to adapt to the changing environment and increase their survivability as a macro-structure. The Complex Adaptive Systems approach builds on replicator dynamics.

The study of complex adaptive systems, a subset of nonlinear dynamical systems, is an interdisciplinary matter that attempts to blend insights from the natural and social sciences to develop system-level models and insights that allow for heterogeneous agents, phase transition, and emergent behavior. CAS is increasingly applied to analyze political-economic development and institutional change, where outcomes emerge from interactions among adaptive agents, and may be influenced but not precisely controlled.

== Overview ==
The term complex adaptive systems, or complexity science, is often used to describe the loosely organized academic field that has grown up around the study of such systems. Complexity science is not a single theory—it encompasses more than one theoretical framework and is interdisciplinary, seeking the answers to some fundamental questions about living, adaptable, changeable systems. Complex adaptive systems may adopt hard or softer approaches. Hard theories use formal language that is precise, tend to see agents as having tangible properties, and usually see objects in a behavioral system that can be manipulated in some way. Softer theories use natural language and narratives that may be imprecise, and agents are subjects having both tangible and intangible properties. Examples of hard complexity theories include complex adaptive systems (CAS) and viability theory, and a class of softer theory is Viable System Theory. Many of the propositional consideration made in hard theory are also of relevance to softer theory. From here on, interest will now center on CAS.

The study of CAS focuses on complex, emergent and macroscopic properties of the system. John H. Holland said that CAS "are systems that have a large numbers of components, often called agents, that interact and adapt or learn."

Typical examples of complex adaptive systems include: climate; cities; firms; markets; governments; industries; ecosystems; social networks; power grids; animal swarms; traffic flows; social insect (e.g. ant) colonies; the brain and the immune system; and the cell and the developing embryo. Human social group-based endeavors, such as political parties, communities, geopolitical organizations, war, supply chains and terrorist networks are also considered CAS. The internet and cyberspace—composed, collaborated, and managed by a complex mix of human–computer interactions, is also regarded as a complex adaptive system. CAS can be hierarchical, but more often exhibit aspects of "self-organization".

The term complex adaptive system was coined in 1968 by sociologist Walter F. Buckley who proposed a model of cultural evolution which regards psychological and socio-cultural systems as analogous with biological species. In the modern context, complex adaptive system is sometimes linked to memetics, or proposed as a reformulation of memetics. Michael D. Cohen and Robert Axelrod however argue the approach is not social Darwinism or sociobiology because, even though the concepts of variation, interaction and selection can be applied to modelling 'populations of business strategies', for example, the detailed evolutionary mechanisms are often distinctly unbiological. As such, complex adaptive system is more similar to Richard Dawkins's idea of replicators.

=== General properties ===
What distinguishes a complex adaptive system (CAS) from a pure multi-agent system (MAS) is the focus on top-level properties and features like self-similarity, complexity, emergence and self-organization. Theorists define an MAS as a system composed of multiple interacting agents; whereas in CAS, the agents as well as the system are adaptive and the system is self-similar. A CAS is a complex, self-similar collectivity of interacting, adaptive agents. Complex adaptive systems feature a high degree of adaptive capacity, giving them resilience in the face of perturbation.

Other important properties include adaptation (or homeostasis), communication, cooperation, specialization, spatial and temporal organization, and reproduction. Such properties can manifest themselves on all levels: cells specialize, adapt and reproduce themselves just like larger organisms do. Communication and cooperation take place on all levels, from the agent- to the system-level. In some cases the forces driving co-operation between agents in such a system can be analyzed using game theory.

=== Characteristics ===
Some of the most important characteristics of complex adaptive systems are:

- The number of elements is sufficiently large that conventional descriptions (e.g. a system of differential equations) are not only impractical, but cease to assist in understanding the system. Moreover, the elements interact dynamically, and the interactions can be physical or involve the exchange of information.
- Such interactions are rich, i.e. any element or sub-system in the system is affected by and affects several other elements or sub-systems.
- The interactions are non-linear: small changes in inputs, physical interactions or stimuli can cause large effects or very significant changes in outputs.
- Interactions are primarily but not exclusively with immediate neighbours and the nature of the influence is modulated.
- Any interaction can feed back onto itself directly or after a number of intervening stages. Such feedback can vary in quality. This is known as recurrency.
- The overall behavior of the system of elements is not predicted by the behavior of the individual elements
- Such systems may be open and it may be difficult or impossible to define system boundaries
- Complex systems operate under far from equilibrium conditions. There has to be a constant flow of energy to maintain the organization of the system
- Agents in the system are adaptive. They update their strategies in response to input from other agents, and the system itself.
- Elements in the system may be ignorant of the behaviour of the system as a whole, responding only to the information or physical stimuli available to them locally

Robert Axelrod & Michael D. Cohen identify a series of key terms from a modeling perspective:

- Strategy, a conditional action pattern that indicates what to do in which circumstances
- Artifact, a material resource that has definite location and can respond to the action of agents
- Agent, a collection of properties, strategies & capabilities for interacting with artifacts & other agents
- Population, a collection of agents, or, in some situations, collections of strategies
- System, a larger collection, including one or more populations of agents and possibly also artifacts
- Type, all the agents (or strategies) in a population that have some characteristic in common
- Variety, the diversity of types within a population or system
- Interaction pattern, the recurring regularities of contact among types within a system
- Space (physical), location in geographical space & time of agents and artifacts
- Space (conceptual), "location" in a set of categories structured so that "nearby" agents will tend to interact
- Selection, processes that lead to an increase or decrease in the frequency of various types of agent or strategies
- Success criteria or performance measures, a "score" used by an agent or designer in attributing credit in the selection of relatively successful (or unsuccessful) strategies or agents

Turner and Baker synthesized the characteristics of complex adaptive systems from the literature and tested these characteristics in the context of creativity and innovation. Each of these eight characteristics had been shown to be present in the creativity and innovative processes:

- Path dependent: Systems tend to be sensitive to their initial conditions. The same force might affect systems differently.
- Systems have a history: The future behavior of a system depends on its initial starting point and subsequent history.
- Non-linearity: React disproportionately to environmental perturbations. Outcomes differ from those of simple systems.
- Emergence: Each system's internal dynamics affect its ability to change in a manner that might be quite different from other systems.
- Irreducible: Irreversible process transformations cannot be reduced back to its original state.
- Adaptive/Adaptability: Systems that are simultaneously ordered and disordered are more adaptable and resilient.
- Operates between order and chaos: Adaptive tension emerges from the energy differential between the system and its environment.
- Self-organizing: Systems are composed of interdependency, interactions of its parts, and diversity in the system.

== Adaptation mechanisms ==
The organisation of a complex adaptive system rely on the use of internal models, mental models or schemas guiding the behaviors of the system. We can distinguish three levels of adaptation of a system:

- Using a schema to react to changing circumstances in the environment.
- Changing a schema when the existing one does not lead to satisfactory outcomes.
- Selecting the systems using successful schemata among a population (survival of the fittest).

== Modelling and simulation ==
CAS are occasionally modelled by means of agent-based models and complex network-based models. Agent-based models are developed by means of various methods and tools primarily by means of first identifying the different agents inside the model. Another method of developing models for CAS involves developing complex network models by means of using interaction data of various CAS components.

Models and simulations are often used to study proposed systems phenomena in large infrastructural systems, where empirical testing would be prohibitively expensive and risky. Examples include those use of applied agent-based and graph-theoretic approaches to digital supply-chain twins and anomaly detection in high-speed networks.

In 2013 SpringerOpen/BioMed Central launched an online open-access journal on the topic of complex adaptive systems modelling (CASM). Publication of the journal ceased in 2020.

== Evolution of complexity ==
Passive versus active trends in the evolution of complexity. CAS at the beginning of the processes are colored red. Changes in the number of systems are shown by the height of the bars, with each set of graphs moving up in a time series.

Living organisms are complex adaptive systems. Although complexity is hard to quantify in biology, evolution has produced some remarkably complex organisms. This observation has led to the common misconception of evolution being progressive and leading towards what are viewed as "higher organisms".

If this were generally true, evolution would possess an active trend towards complexity. As shown below, in this type of process the value of the most common amount of complexity would increase over time. Indeed, some artificial life simulations have suggested that the generation of CAS is an inescapable feature of evolution.

However, the idea of a general trend towards complexity in evolution can also be explained through a passive process. This involves an increase in variance but the most common value, the mode, does not change. Thus, the maximum level of complexity increases over time, but only as an indirect product of there being more organisms in total. This type of random process is also called a bounded random walk.

In this hypothesis, the apparent trend towards more complex organisms is an illusion resulting from concentrating on the small number of large, very complex organisms that inhabit the right-hand tail of the complexity distribution and ignoring simpler and much more common organisms. This passive model emphasizes that the overwhelming majority of species are microscopic prokaryotes, which comprise about half the world's biomass and constitute the vast majority of Earth's biodiversity. Therefore, simple life remains dominant on Earth, and complex life appears more diverse only because of sampling bias.

If there is a lack of an overall trend towards complexity in biology, this would not preclude the existence of forces driving systems towards complexity in a subset of cases. These minor trends would be balanced by other evolutionary pressures that drive systems towards less complex states.

== See also ==
- Artificial life
- Chaos theory
- Cognitive science
- Cognitive model § Mother-fetus cognitive model
- Command and Control Research Program
- Complex system
- Computational sociology
- Dual-phase evolution
- Econophysics
- Enterprise systems engineering
- Generative sciences
- Mean-field game theory
- Open system (systems theory)
- Santa Fe Institute
- Simulated reality
- Sociology and complexity science
- Super wicked problem
- Swarm Development Group
- Universal Darwinism

== Literature ==
- Ahmed E, Elgazzar AS, Hegazi AS (28 June 2005). "An overview of complex adaptive systems". Mansoura J. Math. 32: 6059. arXiv:nlin.AO/0506059v1. Bibcode:2005nlin......6059A.
- Bullock S, Cliff D (2004). "Complexity and Emergent Behaviour in ICT Systems". Hewlett-Packard Labs. HP-2004-187.; commissioned as a report by the UK government's Foresight Programme.
- Dooley, K., Complexity in Social Science glossary a research training project of the European Commission.
- Edwin E. Olson; Glenda H. Eoyang (2001). Facilitating Organization Change. San Francisco: Jossey-Bass. ISBN 0-7879-5330-X.
- Gell-Mann, Murray (1994). The quark and the jaguar: adventures in the simple and the complex. San Francisco: W.H. Freeman. ISBN 0-7167-2581-9.
- Holland, John H. (1992). Adaptation in natural and artificial systems: an introductory analysis with applications to biology, control, and artificial intelligence. Cambridge, Massachusetts: MIT Press. ISBN 0-262-58111-6.
- Holland, John H. (1999). Emergence: from chaos to order. Reading, Mass: Perseus Books. ISBN 0-7382-0142-1.
- Solvit, Samuel (2012). Dimensions of War: Understanding War as a Complex Adaptive System. Paris, France: L'Harmattan. ISBN 978-2-296-99721-9.
- Kelly, Kevin (1994). Out of control: the new biology of machines, social systems and the economic world (Full text available online). Boston: Addison-Wesley. ISBN 0-201-48340-8.
- Pharaoh, M.C. (online). Looking to systems theory for a reductive explanation of phenomenal experience and evolutionary foundations for higher order thought Archived 25 October 2008 at the Wayback Machine Retrieved 15 January 2008.
- Hobbs, George & Scheepers, Rens (2010),"Agility in Information Systems: Enabling Capabilities for the IT Function," Pacific Asia Journal of the Association for Information Systems: Vol. 2: Iss. 4, Article 2. Link
- Sidney Dekker (2011). Drift into Failure: From Hunting Broken Components to Understanding Complex Systems. CRC Press.
