= Project Cybersyn =

Chilean 1971–73 economic management project

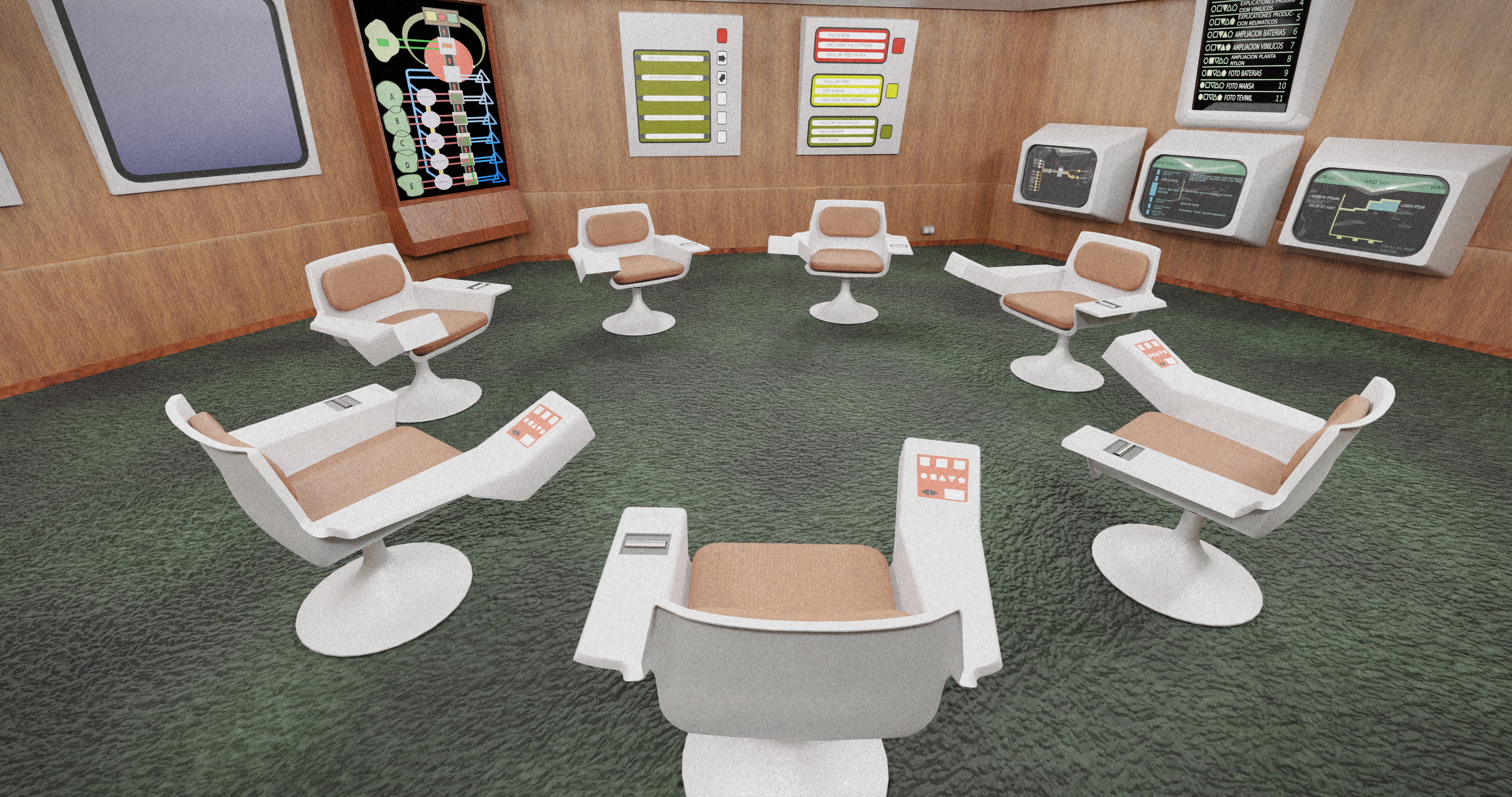
A 3D render of the Operations Room (or Opsroom): a physical location where economic information was to be received, stored, and made available for speedy decision-making. It was designed in accordance with Gestalt principles to give users a platform that would enable them to absorb information in a simple but comprehensive way.

Project Cybersyn was a Chilean economic project developed from 1971 to 1973 during the socialist presidency of Salvador Allende (1970–1973), with the purpose of constructing a distributed decision-support system to aid in the management of the national economy. The project consisted of four modules: an economic simulator, custom software to check factory performance, an operations room, and a national network of telex machines that linked to a single mainframe computer.

Project Cybersyn, based on a viable system model (VSM) theory approach to organizational design, featured innovative technology at its time. It included a network of telex machines (Cybernet) in state-run enterprises that would transmit and receive information to and from the government in Santiago.

Information from the field would feed into statistical-modeling software (Cyberstride) that would monitor production indicators, such as raw-material supplies or high rates of worker absenteeism. It alerted workers in near-real time. If parameters fell significantly outside acceptable ranges, it notified the central government. The information would also be input into economic simulation software (CHECO, for CHilean ECOnomic simulator). The government could use this to forecast the possible outcome of economic decisions. Finally, a sophisticated operations room (Opsroom) would provide a space where managers could see relevant economic data. They would formulate feasible responses to emergencies and transmit advice and directives to enterprises and factories in alarm situations by using the telex network.

The principal architect of the system was British operations research scientist Stafford Beer (1926–2002), and the system embodied his notions of management cybernetics in industrial management. One of its main objectives was to devolve decision-making power within industrial enterprises to their workforce to develop self-regulation of factories.

Project Cybersyn ended following Allende's removal and death during the coup d'état of 11 September 1973. After the coup, the Chilean military abandoned Cybersyn and destroyed the operations room.

== Name ==
The project's name in English ('Cybersyn') is a portmanteau of the words 'cybernetics' and 'synergy'. Since the name is not euphonic in Spanish, in that language the project was called Synco, both an initialism for the Spanish Sistema de Información y Control ('System of Information and Control'), and a pun on the Spanish cinco, the number 5, alluding to the 5 levels of Beer's viable system model.

== System ==
The exact number of teleprinters used hasn't been confirmed. The most cited number being 500. While other sources suggest it could have been much lower. Using teleprinters each factory would send quantified indices of production processes such as raw material input, production output, number of absentees, etc. These indices would later feed a statistical analysis program that, running on a mainframe computer in Santiago, would make short-term predictions about the factories' performance and suggest necessary adjustments, which, after discussion in an operations room, would be fed back to the factories. This process occurred at 4 levels: firm, branch, sector, and total.

A fundamental phase of the project was to quantify the production processes in the factories. This began with operational research (OR) engineers visiting the factories and modeling their production flows using a technique that Beer and the local team called "quantified flowcharting". It consisted of drawing a flowchart of the entire production process of a given factory, focusing on the "bottlenecks" of such a process. The connections from one point in the process to another had to be quantified in order to find those bottlenecks. This was a time-consuming process, for which only one OR engineer was assigned to model a given factory. This is likely the reason why, at the end of the project, only about twenty factories were modeled and connected to the transmission and processing system.

Once a factory was modeled, it was necessary to collect indices of processes on a daily basis. The "quantified flowcharting" technique used by the project team explicitly required the modelers to rely on the factory operators' knowledge of their own relationships to their machines to generate these indices. This is reminiscent of earlier bottom-up cybernetic processes, such as those signaled by Pasquinelli in his article "Italian Operaismo and the Information Machine".

The collected indexes were then recorded on a paper form and given to a typist secretary at the factory who, using an in-house teletype machine, sent these data to a traffic station, where the information was first checked for format accuracy.

Algedonic feedback improved system adaptability and viability. If one level of control did not remedy a problem in a certain interval, the higher level was notified. The results were discussed in the operations room and a top-level plan was made. The network of telex machines, called 'Cybernet', was the first operational component of Cybersyn, and the only one regularly used by the Allende government.

Beer proposed what was initially called Project Cyberstride, a system that would take in information and metrics from production centers like factories, process it on a central mainframe, and output predictions of future trends based on historical data. The software used Bayesian filtering and Bayesian control. It was fundamental written by British engineers of the Arthur Andersen consultancy company and implemented in Santiago with Chilean engineers of the National Company of Computation, ECOM. Cybersyn first ran on an IBM 360/50, but later was transferred to a less heavily used Burroughs 3500 mainframe. New research, however, suggests that the project's software suite always ran on ECOM's IBM 360/50 mainframe computer.

The futuristic operations room was designed by a team led by the interface designer Gui Bonsiepe. It was furnished with 7 swivel chairs, considered the best for creativity. The chairs had buttons to control several large screens that projected data, and status panels that showed slides of preprepared graphs. The tulip chairs were similar in style to those in Star Trek, but the designers claimed no science fiction influence.

The project is described in some detail in the second edition of Stafford Beer's books Brain of the Firm and Platform for Change. The latter book includes proposals for social innovations such as having representatives of diverse 'stakeholder' groups into the control center.

A related development known as Project Cyberfolk, which Beer envisioned as an extension of Cybersyn but never realized, would allow citizens to send real-time feedback to the government about their level of satisfaction or dissatisfaction with policies announced on television.

== Implementation ==
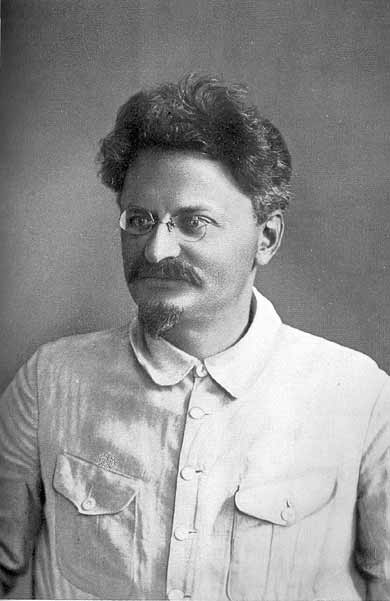
Leon Trotsky's critique of the Soviet Union influenced Beer's shifting political views and the design of the Cybersyn model.

Stafford Beer was a British consultant in management cybernetics. He also sympathized with the stated ideals of Chilean socialism of maintaining Chile's democratic system and the autonomy of workers instead of imposing a USSR-style system of top-down command and control. He also read Leon Trotsky's critique of Soviet bureaucracy, which influenced his design of the system in Chile.

In July 1971, Fernando Flores, a high-level employee of the Chilean Production Development Corporation (CORFO) under the instruction of Pedro Vuskovic, contacted Beer for advice on incorporating cybernetic theories into the management of the newly nationalized sectors of Chile's economy. Beer saw this as a unique opportunity to implement his ideas on a national scale. More than just offering advice, he left most of his other consulting contracts and devoted much of his time to what became Project Cybersyn. He traveled to Chile often to collaborate with local implementers and used his personal contacts to secure help from British technical experts.

With an initial implementation date of March 1972, the aggressive implementation schedule led to the system reaching prototype stage in 1972. As Cybersyn took shape, it impacted events in Chile.

=== Impact ===
The Chilean government found success in its initial nationalization efforts, achieving a 7.7% rise in GDP and 13.7% rise in production in its first year, but needed to maintain continued growth to find long-term success. According to technology historian Eden Medina, 26.7% of the nationalized industries which were responsible for 50% of the sector revenue had been incorporated to some degree into the Cybersyn system by May 1973. The total costs of the economic simulator amounted to £5,000 at the time of design ($38,000 in 2009 dollars).

The Cybersyn system was used effectively in October 1972. The telex network enabled communication across regions and the maintenance of distribution of essential goods across the country. According to Gustavo Silva, then the executive secretary of energy in CORFO, the system's telex machines helped organize the transport of resources into the city with only about 200 trucks, lessening the potential damage caused by the employers' truck strike. The government of Salvador Allende relied on real-time data to respond to the changing strike situation.

The strike actions against the Allende government were alleged by some to have been funded by the United States as part of an economic warfare strategy. The elected Allende government survived in part due to the Cybersyn system. Eventually the Allende government was brought down by a coup d'état in 1973. Other governments, such as those in Brazil and South Africa, expressed interest in building up their own Cybersyn system. In the history of computing hardware, Project Cybersyn was a conceptual leap forward, in that computation was no longer put exclusively to work by the military or scientific institutions.

Illustrations of the Operations Room
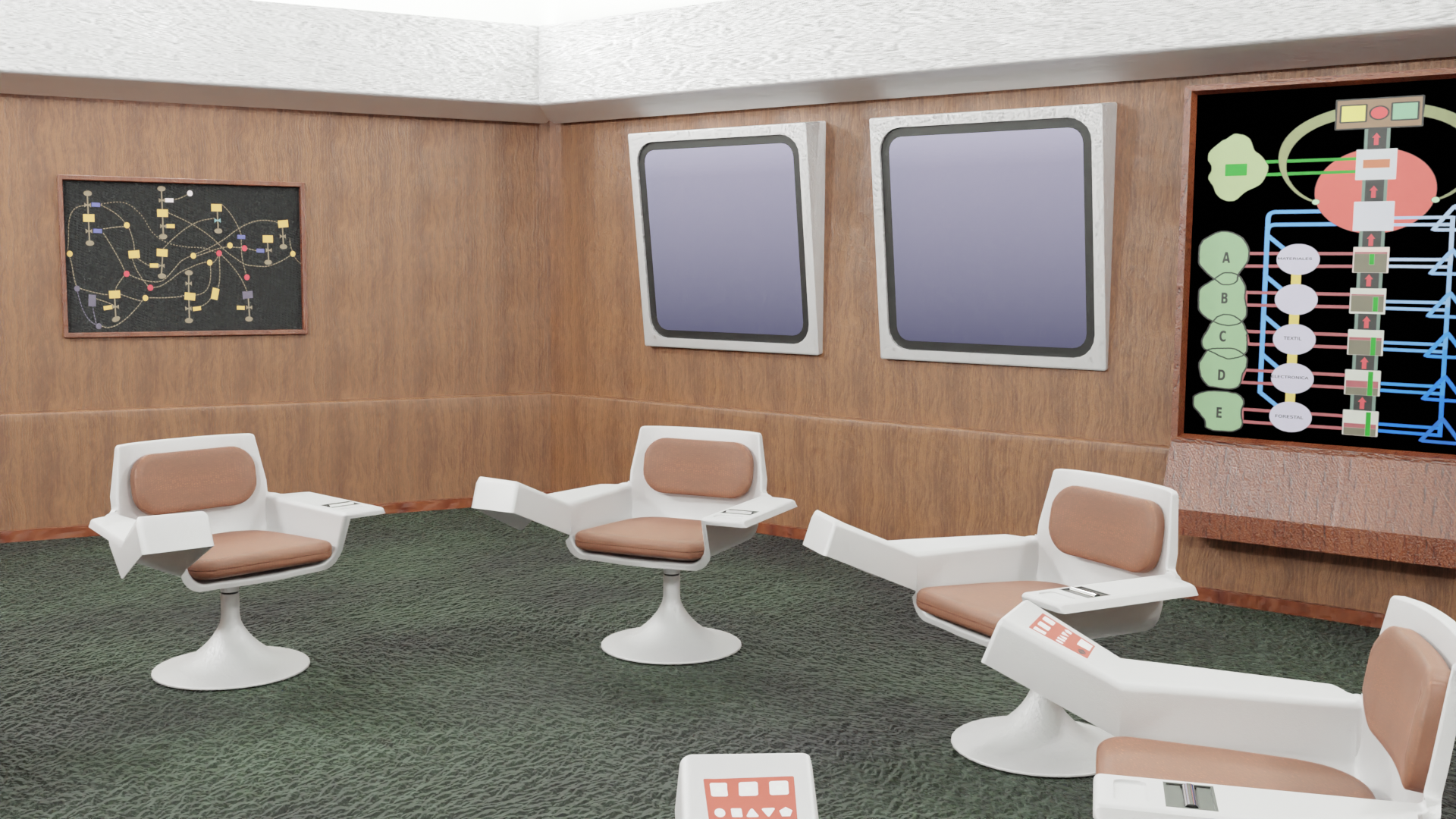
Left to right: the magnetic "Panel of the Future", 2 slide screens, and "Staffy", the reminder of the Viable Systems Model

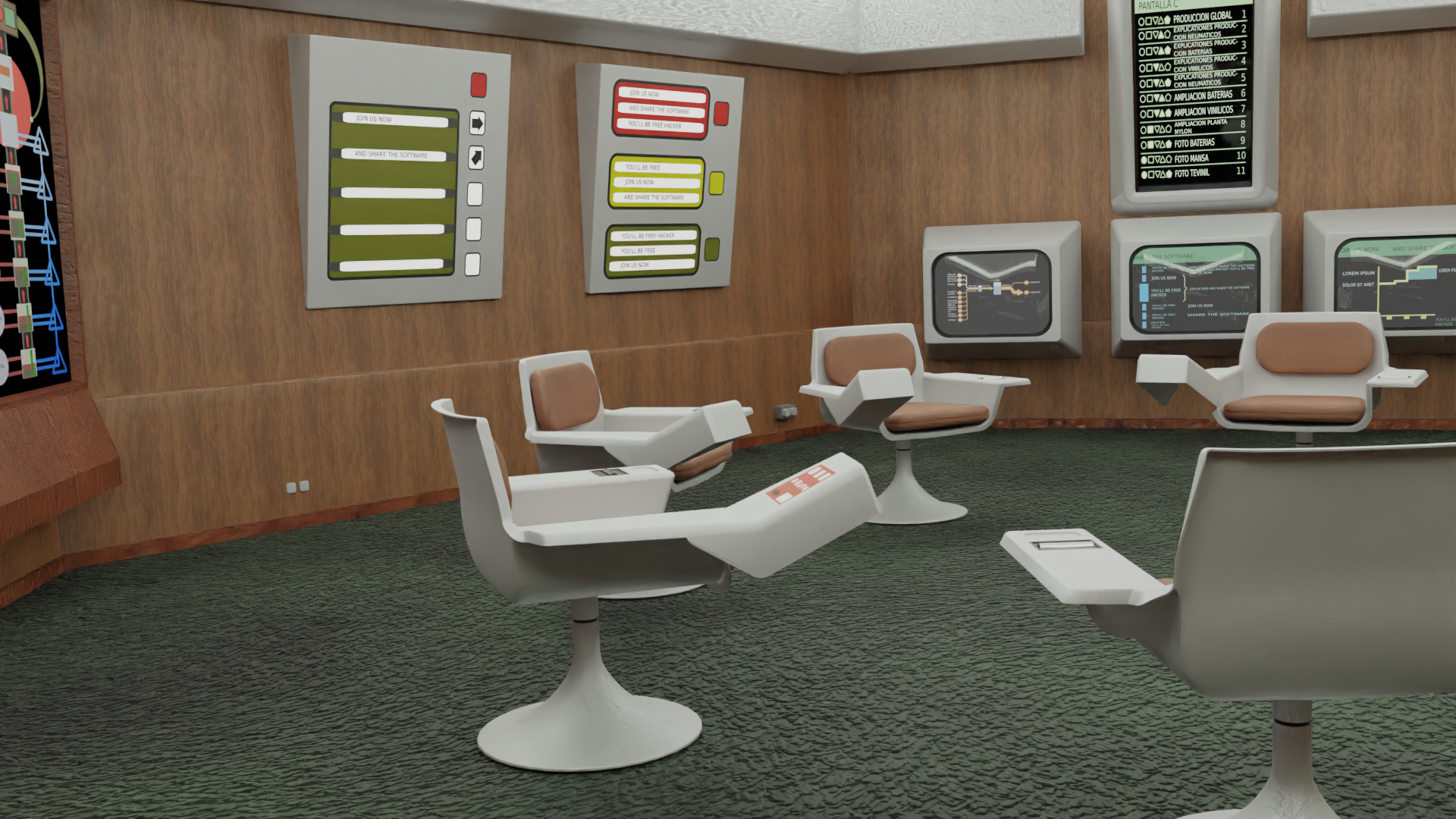
Left to right: "Staffy", the 2 "algedonic displays" and the 4 screen Data Feed

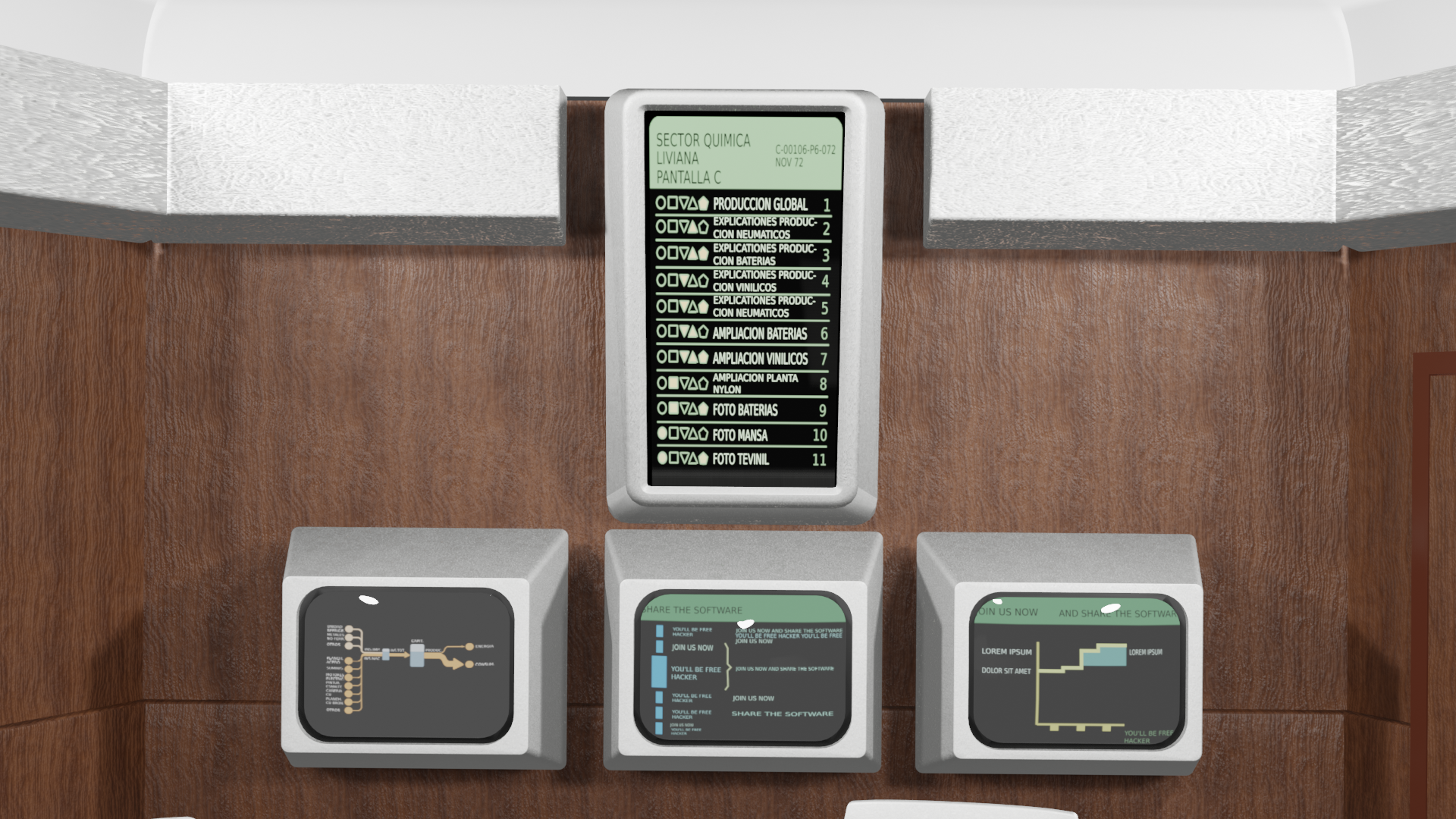
Close-up of the data Feed

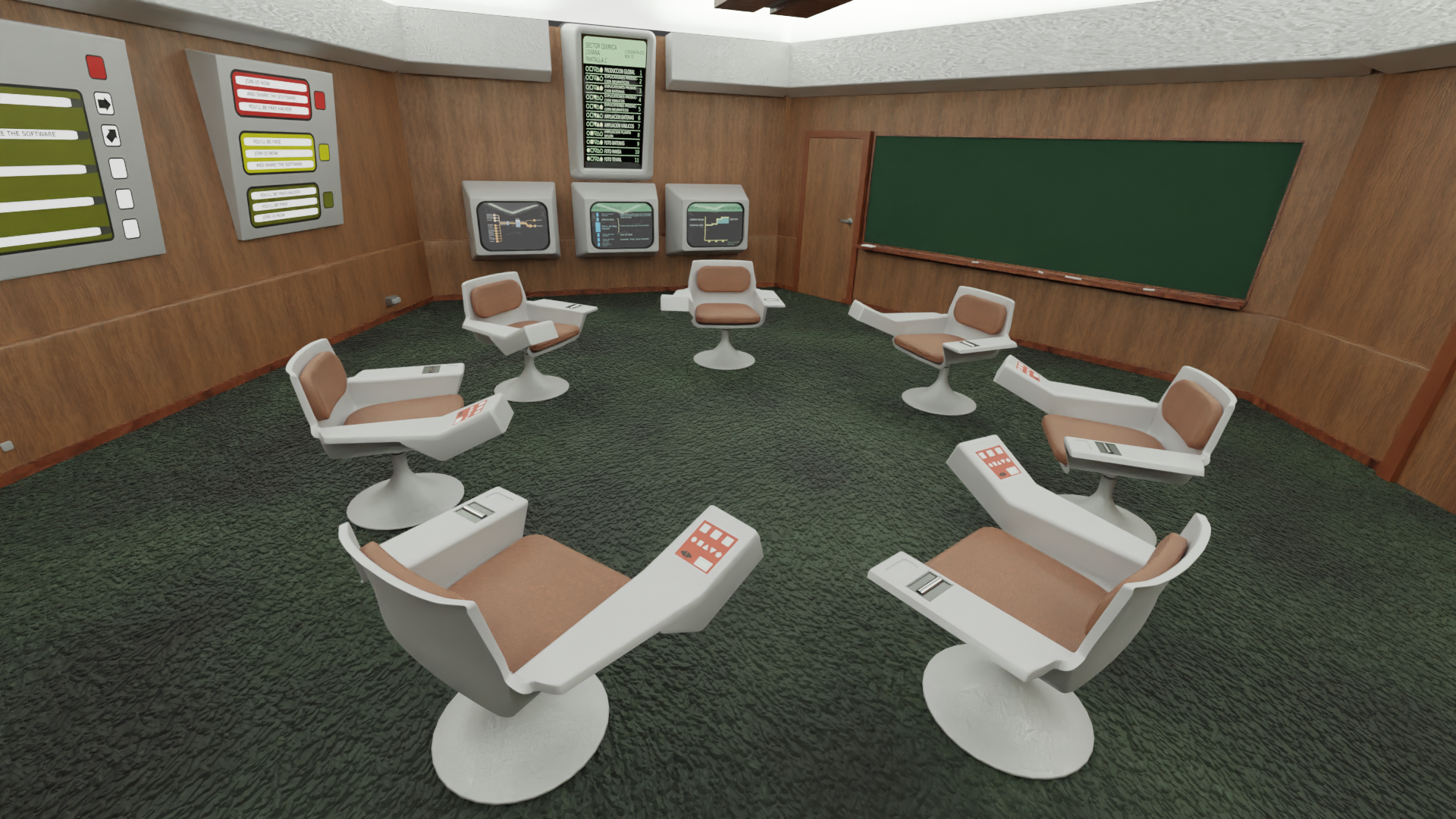
The 2 "algedonic displays", the 4 screen Data Feed, and the black board. The control panels visible on the armrests.

Panoramic video of the room

== Legacy ==
The legacy of Project Cybersyn extended beyond supporting the Allende government, inspiring others to explore innovations in economic planning.

=== Historical significance ===
Computer scientist Paul Cockshott and economist Allin Cottrell referenced Project Cybersyn in their 1993 book Towards a New Socialism, citing it as an inspiration for their own proposed model of computer-managed socialist planned economy. The Guardian in 2003 called the project "a sort of socialist internet, decades ahead of its time". While Cockshott and Cottrell created a proposed model, another author explored fictional alternatives.

=== Fictional portrayals ===
Chilean author Jorge Baradit published a Spanish-language science fiction novel SYNCO in 2008. It is set in an alternate history year 1979 where the 1973 coup had failed and "the socialist government consolidated and created 'the first cybernetic state, a universal example, the true third way, a miracle'." Baradit's novel imagines the realized project as an oppressive dictatorship of totalitarian control, disguised as a bright utopia.

=== Defenses and critiques ===
In defense of the project, former operations manager of Cybersyn Raul Espejo wrote: "the safeguard against any technocratic tendency was precisely in the very implementation of CyberSyn, which required a social structure based on autonomy and coordination to make its tools viable. [...] Of course, politically it was always possible to use information technologies for coercive purposes, but that would have been a different project, certainly not Synco".

More recently, a journalist saw Cybersyn prefiguring algorithmic monitoring concerns. In a 2014 essay for The New Yorker, technology journalist Evgeny Morozov argued that Cybersyn helped pave the way for big data and anticipated how Big Tech would operate, citing Uber's use of data and algorithms to monitor supply and demand for their services in real time as an example.

=== Contemporary relevance ===
Writers explored Cybersyn as a model for planned economies using contemporary processing power. Authors Leigh Phillips and Michał Rozworski also dedicated a chapter on the project in their 2019 book The People's Republic of Walmart. The authors presented a case to defend the feasibility of a planned economy aided by contemporary processing power used by large organizations such as Amazon, Walmart and the Pentagon. The authors question whether much can be built on Project Cybersyn, specifically, "whether a system used in emergency, near–civil war conditions in a single country—covering a limited number of enterprises and, admittedly, only partially ameliorating a dire situation—can be applied in times of peace and at a global scale." The project remained uncompleted due to the military coup in 1973, which led to economic reforms by the Chicago Boys.

=== Media coverage ===
Cybersyn also caught the attention of podcasters. In October 2016, the podcast 99% Invisible produced an episode about the project. The Radio Ambulante podcast covered some history of Allende and Project Cybersyn in their 2019 episode The Room That Was A Brain.

Finally, Morozov expanded from an essay into his own podcast series. In July 2023, Morozov produced a nine-part podcast about Cybersyn, Stafford Beer and the group around Salvador Allende, titled 'The Santiago Boys'.

== See also ==
- Alexander Kharkevich, the director of the Institute for Information Transmission Problems in Moscow (later Kharkevich Institute)
- Comparison of system dynamics software
- Critique of political economy
- Cyberocracy
- Cybernetics in the Soviet Union
- Economic calculation debate
- Economic planning
- Enterprise resource planning
- Fernando Flores
- Victor Glushkov (1923–1982) Soviet mathematician and founding father of Soviet cybernetics
- History of Chile
- History of computer hardware in Eastern Bloc countries
- Material balance planning
- Management cybernetics
- OGAS
- Planned economy
- Post-scarcity
- Socialist democracy
- Scientific socialism
- System dynamics
- The Lucas Plan
- Viable system model
