= Macrostructure (linguistics) =

Overall meaning in discourse analysis

In linguistics and discourse analysis, semantic macrostructures are the overall, global meanings of discourse, usually also described in terms of topic, gist, or upshot. These semantic macrostructures (global meanings or topics) are typically expressed in for instance the headlines and lead of a news report, or the title and the abstract of a scholarly article. Macrostructures of discourse are distinguished from its microstructures, that is, the local structures of words, clauses, sentences or turns in conversation. Macrostructures may be derived from microstructures by operations such as abstracting, that is, leaving out or summarizing specific details. Semantic macrostructures or topics define what is called the global coherence of discourse.

This concept was first proposed by Teun A. van Dijk in 1977. Macrostructure is an important concept in the Construction-Integration (CI) model detailed by Walter Kintsch in his landmark tome, Comprehension: A Paradigm for Cognition.
