= Feedforward =

Process where information about desired future status is used to influence future status

Feedforward is a term coined by the literary critic I. A. Richards in 1951 at the 8th Macy conference on cybernetics. Feedforward relates to feedback, another cybernetic concept, but while feedback is a reaction to the output of a process, feedforward is the anticipation of what the output might be.

Richards discussed this in terms of human communication, arguing that to be understood, a speaker has to feedforward the context of what they want to talk about, anticipating what the audience might not understand and adjusting what one plans to say to accommodate that.

The term was taken up by cyberneticians, who had previously only used negative and positive feedback. It was also used by media theorist Marshall McLuhan, and has been taken up in management theory, control theory, neural networks and behavioral and cognitive science.

== Etymology ==
The term was developed by I. A. Richards when he participated in the 8th Macy conference. I. A. Richards was a literary critic with a particular interest in rhetoric. Pragmatics is a subfield within linguistics which focuses on the use of context to assist meaning. In the context of the Macy Conference, Richards remarked "Feedforward, as I see it, is the reciprocal, the necessary condition of what the cybernetics and automation people call 'feedback'." Richards subsequently continued: "The point is that feedforward is a needed prescription or plan for a feedback, to which the actual feedback may or may not confirm." The term was picked up and developed by the cybernetics community. This enabled the word to then be introduced to more specific fields such as control systems, management, neural networks, cognitive studies and behavioural science.

== Different applications of feedforward ==
=== Control ===
Feed forward is a type of element or pathway within a control system. Feedforward control uses measurement of a disturbance input to control a manipulated input. This differs from feedback, which uses measurement of any output to control a manipulated input.

=== Management ===
Feedforward has been applied to the context of management. It often involves giving a pre-feedback to a person or an organization from which you are expecting a feedback.

=== Neural network ===
A feedforward neural network is a type of artificial neural network.

=== Behavioral and cognitive science ===
Feedforward is the concept of learning from the future concerning the desired behavior which the subject is encouraged to adopt.
