= Viable systems approach =

The viable systems approach (VSA) is a systems theory in which the observed entities and their environment are interpreted through a systemic viewpoint, starting with the analysis of fundamental elements and finally considering more complex related systems. The assumption is that each entity/system is related to other systems, placed at higher level of observation, called supra-systems, whose traits can be detected in their own subsystems (principle of system hierarchy).

The fundamental unit of analysis is a system made up of many parts or structures. In this sense, every entity (a firm, or simply an individual, a consumer, or a community) as a system can be considered a micro-environment, made up of a group of interlinked sub-components which aim towards a common goal (this is the condition, for the aggregate, to be qualified as a system).

The viable system model was first proposed by Anthony Stafford Beer. In general terms, a viable system is finalized toward its vitality throughout viable behavior based upon consonant and resonant relationships.

== Systems thinking ==
Systems thinking contributed in a significant manner to the creation of a new conception of phenomenological reality, as a synthesis of philosophical, sociological, mathematical, physical and biological approaches, influencing culture and its prevalent values founded on the axiomatic corpus of Cartesian thought, has set off a paradigm revolution, moving on from a reductionist-mechanistic approach to reality, and modifying the traditional investigation model. Having rapidly spread to all areas of study, the systems approach has become the result of reflection, theoretical contribution, and formalisation, creating an epistemological approach to research and to the study of a complex reality.

The origins of systems theory go back to the 1950s when a group of scholars from various scientific and social fields (von Bertalanffy in 1956, and others) developed an interdisciplinary theory based on the concept of systems. Their systems viewpoint rejected the idea that certain phenomena could be fully understood exclusively through an analytical approach, especially when the investigated subject consisted of complex phenomenon characterized by significant interaction among its components, as with the firm. In such a case, full understanding could be achieved through a global vision of the subject in question—a systemic vision—by applying a research method of this organized complexity.

Systems thinking comes from the shift in attention from the part to the whole, implying a perception of reality as an integrated and interacting unicuum of phenomena, where the individual properties of the single parts become indistinct, while the relationships between the parts themselves and the events they produce through their interaction, become more important (in other words we may say that "system elements are rationally connected").

The systems approach does not coincide with the holistic approach and is not in opposition to the analytical-reductionist approach. Rather, it is an approach which, placing itself within a continuum with reductionism and holism at its extremities, is able to reconcile the two. From the analysis of the elementary components of a phenomenon, it is always possible to arrive at, and then explain, a phenomenon in its entirety.

== Description ==
The VSA is a scientific approach to business theory that has become increasingly prominent in Italian academic circles in the past decade. Based upon system theory, VSA focuses on the analysis of relationships among socio-economic entities in search of viable interacting conditions. According to VSA, every entity (a business or an individual) can be considered a system of many parts or structures, made up of a group of interlinked sub-components, with the aim of realising a common goal.

The viable systems approach proposes a deep analysis of the structure/systems dichotomy, proposing that every system represents a recognisable entity emerging from a specific changing structure (set of individual elements with assigned roles, activities and tasks performing in compliance with rules and constraints). Since a system originates from its structure, its evolution derives from the dynamic activation of static existing basic relationships. A structure can be studied (what it is? How it is made?), a system should only be interpreted (how does it work? What logics does it follow?)". This means that the static structure brings up the recognition of various possible systems dependant on the finalities and final goal; e.g., a human being is composed by many components assembled within a physical structure, but in the dynamic view man and women may be eating, sleeping, playing tennis or bridge, and all of these are different possible system behaviors.

Another important VSA proposal is represented in the following figure, derived from Beer's first conceptualization of the decision making area and operating structure. Basically, VSA advances upon Stafford Beer's proposal, based upon the distribution of numerous managerial and operative decisions within the operating structure area. The management system can limit the real decision making to strategic and high level issues, involving every decision maker. In a similar way, we may say that the operating area of a human being involves the decision of going to jog, requiring the person to wear a sport outfit and running shoes; on the other hand, the decision about pursuing higher education, starting a new venture, or practicing within an existing business, may be relegated within the higher control system.

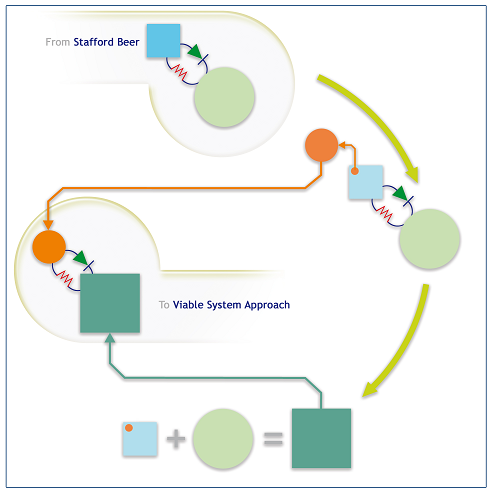

In addition, the viable systems approach introduces the conceptual matrix. This is based upon an iterative process of conception and realization of a viable system. It starts from an idea that needs to be framed within a logical model, then expressed in a physical structure. Once the physical structure is defined it can relate with external resources and systems, embracing them within an extended structure that, via its dynamics, can give birth to numerous specific structures and eventually end up to be a viable system. This recursive process may represent the development of a business just as much as an industrial district.

== VSA origins ==
Starting from this theoretical basis, the VSA has integrated several multidisciplinary contributions, applying them to the observation of complex entities. Principally, it has developed its theory around several key concepts derived by other disciplines: from system thinking (open system aspects), from natural and ecological sciences (particularly the organic aspects of homeostasis and equifinality), from chemical and biological disciplines (deepening concepts such as autopoiesis), from sociology and psychology (an enlightening theory was cognitivism), and from information technology (specifically we refer to IT roots based on cybernetics studies). VSA enables an analysis of the relationships that exist among an enterprise's internal components, as well as an analysis of the relationships between enterprises and other systemic entities in its environmental context.

According to VSA, an enterprise develops as an open system that is characterised by:

- many components (both tangible and intangible);
- interdependence and communication among these components;
- activation of these relationships in order to pursue the system's goal.

=== Key concepts ===
Some founding concepts of the VSA should be made clear to the reader:

1. a viable system lives; that is, its aim is to survive within a context which is populated by other (viable) systems;
2. every context is subjectively perceived by a viable system's top management (the decision-maker) from analyzing its environment (a macro-system in which the decision maker is submerged) distinguishing and identifying its relevant supra-systems (resources owners) in relation with its objective;
3. context defines the potential of viable systems, within which are a few higher-level systems (relevant supra-systems) able to constrain top management decisions;
4. the system's structural definition and the level of consonance between its evolved components (interacting supra and sub systems), define a given system's effectiveness
5. a viable system has the capability of dynamically adjusting (auto-regulating) its structure: hence we may refer consonance to the system's attempt to correctly interpret contextual signals, and resonance to the expression of the associated adaptive behavior; a system is stable if it satisfies external expectations and needs displayed by relevant supra-systems.

=== Fundamental concepts ===
The 10 fundamental concepts (FCs) of VSA (Principle / Application)
FC1	Individuals, organisations, and social institutions are systems that consist of elements directed towards a specific goal.	People, families, networks, enterprises, public and private organisations are complex entities, all of which can be understood as systems.
FC2	Every system (of level L) interacts with several supra-systems positioned at a higher level (L+1) and several sub-systems, located at a lower level (L-1).	Every hierarchy of systems is determined by observation from a specific perspective. The designation of a 'supra-system' or a 'sub-systems' is thus subjective.
FC3	The interpretation of complex phenomena requires interdisciplinary approaches, and should synthesize both reductionist (analyzing elements and their relations) and holistic views (observing the whole).	The contribution of relationships (static, structural) and interactions (dynamic, systemic) is fundamental to the observed phenomenon (reality).
FC4	Systems are open to connection with other systems for the exchange of resources. A system boundary is an adaptive element, containing all the activities and resources needed for the system's evolution.	Nothing happens in isolation. The exchange of information and capital between open systems is fundamental to the VSA. A boundary encompasses not only those resources "owned" by its members, but all accessible resources (even if these are owned by other systems).
FC5	Viable systems are autopoietic and self-organizing; that is, they are capable of regulating and stabilizing both internal conditions and the aforementioned boundary, maximizing internal possibilities in the face of external constraints.	Many systems are autopoietic, and is thus able to generate new internal conditions. As such, they are also self-organizing, continuously aligning internal and external complexity. These two characteristics are the basis for a sustainable response to opportunities and threats.
FC6	Every organisation is constituted by components that have specific roles, activities, and objectives within constraints, norms, and rules. A system emerges from structure through the transformation of relations into dynamic interactions with sub- and supra-systems.	The passage from structure to system involves a passage from a static view to a dynamic view, and focus shifts from individual components and relations to an holistic view of the observed reality. From the same structure, many behaviors can emerge as a consequence of the various combinations of internal and external components and their various objectives.
FC7	Systems are consonant when the system's components are potentially compatible, whereas they are resonant when there is effective harmonic interaction among components.	Consonant relationships refer to the static view (structure) where you could just evaluate the chances of a positive and harmonic relation. Resonant relations are referred to a dynamic view (systemic), requiring the evaluation of concrete and effective positive and harmonic interactions.
FC8	A system's viability is determined by its capability, over time, to develop harmonic behavior in sub-systems and supra-systems through consonant and resonant relationships.	Viability is related to the system's competitiveness and co-creation capability.
FC9	Business dynamics and viability require continuous structural and systemic changes focused to the alignment of internal structural potentialities with external systemic demands.	The evolutionary dynamics of viable systems demonstrate continuous alignment between internal potentials and external expectations.
FC10	Viable systems continuously align internal complexity with external complexity in order to better manage changes affecting its viable behaviour. Decision-makers within these cognitive processes are influenced by their beliefs, world-views, and information.	Internal and external alignment is achievable through cognitive alignment, a knowledge process that effectively addresses chaos, complexity, complication, and certainty (through processes of abduction, induction and deduction).

== VSA applications ==
- Decision making
- Competition
- Social and human behaviour
- Complexity
- Organization strategy
- Marketing design and management
- Service science
- Managerial systems

== See also ==
- Service-dominant logic
- Viable system theory
