= Unplanned economies =

Type of economy

An unplanned economy is an economy where economic decisions regarding production, investment and resource allocation are not linked together through conscious economic planning. This may refer to subsistence-level economies, systems of barter or to more complex arrangements such as market economies, and hypothetical systems such as self-managed, distributed and network economies. Note that there may be a significant amount of planning within firms in market and mixed-market economies.

== See also ==
- Economic planning
- Economic system
- Gift economy
- Hunter-gatherer economy
- Market economy
- Mixed economy
- Self-managed economy
