= Viability theory =

Viability theory is an area of mathematics that studies the evolution of dynamical systems under constraints on the system state. It was developed to formalize problems arising in the study of various natural and social phenomena, and has close ties to the theories of optimal control and set-valued analysis.

== Motivation ==
Many systems, organizations, and networks arising in biology and the social sciences do not evolve in a deterministic way, nor even in a stochastic way. Rather they evolve with a Darwinian flavor, driven by random fluctuations but yet constrained to remain "viable" by their environment. Viability theory started in 1976 by translating mathematically the title of the book Chance and Necessity by Jacques Monod to the differential inclusion $x '(t) \in F (x (t))$ for chance and $x (t) \in K$ for necessity. The differential inclusion is a type of “evolutionary engine” (called an evolutionary system associating with any initial state x a subset of evolutions starting at x. The system is said to be deterministic if this set is made of one and only one evolution and contingent otherwise. Necessity is the requirement that at each instant, the evolution is viable (remains) in the environment K described by viability constraints, a word encompassing polysemous concepts as stability, confinement, homeostasis, adaptation, etc., expressing the idea that some variables must obey some constraints (representing physical, social, biological and economic constraints, etc.) that can never be violated. So, viability theory starts as the confrontation of evolutionary systems governing evolutions and viability constraints that such evolutions must obey. They share common features:

1. Systems designed by human brains, in the sense that agents, actors, decision-makers act on the evolutionary system, as in engineering (control theory and differential games)
2. Systems observed by human brains, more difficult to understand since there is no consensus on the actors piloting the variable, who, at least, may be myopic, lazy but explorers, conservative but opportunist. This is the case of economics, less in finance, where the viability constraints are the scarcity constraints among many other ones, in connectionist networks and/or cooperative games, in population and social dynamics, in neurosciences and some biological issues.

Viability theory thus designs and develops mathematical and algorithmic methods for investigating the "adaptation to viability constraints" of evolutions governed by complex systems under uncertainty that are found in many domains involving living beings, from biological evolution to economics, from environmental sciences to financial markets, from control theory and robotics to cognitive sciences. It needed to forge a differential calculus of set-valued maps (set-valued analysis), differential inclusions and differential calculus in metric spaces (mutational analysis).

== Viability kernel ==
The basic problem of viability theory is to find the "viability kernel" of an environment, the subset of initial states in the environment such that there exists at least one evolution "viable" in the environment, in the sense that at each time, the state of the evolution remains confined to the environment. The second question is then to provide the regulation map selecting such viable evolutions starting from the viability kernel. The viability kernel may be equal to the environment, in which case the environment is called viable under the evolutionary system, and the empty set, in which case it is called a repellor, because all evolutions eventually violate the constraints.

The viability kernel assumes that some kind of "decision maker" controls or regulates evolutions of the system. If not, the next problem looks at the "tychastic kernel" (from tyche, meaning chance in Greek) or "invariance kernel", the subset of initial states in the environment such that all evolutions are "viable" in the environment, an alternative way to stochastic differential equations encapsulating the concept of "insurance" against uncertainty, providing a way of eradicating it instead of evaluating it.

== See also ==
- Autonomous agency theory
- Viable system theory
