= Feedforward (management) =

Application of cybernetic concept to management theory

Feed forward in management theory is an application of the cybernetic concept of feedforward first articulated by I. A. Richards in 1951. It reflects the impact of Management cybernetics in the general area of management studies.

== Definition ==
It refers to the practice of giving a control impact in a downlink to a subordinate to a person or an organization from which you are expecting an output. A feed forward is not just a pre-feedback, as a feedback is always based on measuring an output and sending respective feedback. A pre-feedback given without measurement of output may be understood as a confirmation or just an acknowledgment of control command.

== Scope ==
However, a feed forward is generally imposed before any willful change in output may occur. All other changes of output determined with feedback may for example result from distortion, noise or attenuation. It usually involves giving a document for review and giving an ex post information on that document which you have not already given.

However, social feedback is the response of the supreme hierarch to the subordinate as an acknowledgement of a subordinate's report on output, hence the subordinate's feedback to the supreme.

== Origin of term ==
Feedforward as a management term has been used by Avraham Kluger since 2006 and Marshall Goldsmith in one of his prominent management articles.

== Example of an activity involving feedforward learning ==
Asking for feedforward requires to set up the participant into a state of open reflection and learning. The feedforward has to be the opposite as feedback, which deals with a past event but rather to give an advice for the future. Therefore a good example might involve asking some group of participants about a personal trait/habit they want to change and then let them give feedforward to each other with advice to achieve that change. The participants then are limited to speak just about future actions within the context of helping each other.
