= IEDC-Bled School of Management =

Business school in Slovenia

Coordinates: 46°22′14.49″N 14°6′31.2″E

- Logo of IEDC
- Type: Private
- Established: 1986
- Dean: prof. Mislav Ante Omazić
- Location: Bled, Slovenia
- Website: www.iedc.si

IEDC-Bled School of Management, located in Bled, Slovenia, is a business school. It was founded in 1986 upon an initiative of Slovenian business community as the International Executive Development Center.

IEDC is dedicated to executive education only, operates independently from any university, and is run by a group of faculty under the President and Dean, Professor Mislav Ante Omazić. IEDC utilizes unique teaching methods: for example, it "has long been a champion of art as a tool in leadership development" (Anderson, 2008), integrated topics such as 'Sustainability for Competitive Advantage" throughout all long programs, and offers one-on-one mentorship with senior leaders for its Executive MBA participants.

The core intention of IEDC-Bled School of Management is to be an agent of change in the region, so courses, professors, and activities are selected to continuously challenge countries with transitional economies to increase business quality and results. To this end, IEDC has founded CEEMAN–Central and Eastern European Management Development Association, the European Leadership Center, the Slovenian chapter of the United Nations Global Compact, and other regional and international initiatives.

== Programs ==
IEDC-Bled School of Management educational programs include:

- Degree programs: 1- year Executive MBA, 2-year Executive MBA, Presidents' MBA, and Executive PhD (launched in 2010)
- Executive education: open enrollment programs, such as a five-week General Management Program, short seminars, as well as custom-made programs developed for individual organizational clients
- International Summer Schools intended for young managers and professionals, including a two-week Young Managers Program, and a 9-day Discover Management Program
