= Macrostructure (sociology) =

In sociology, macrostructures, often simply called 'structure', correspond to the overall organization of society, described at a rather large-scale level, featuring for instance social groups, organizations, institutions, nation-states and their respective properties and relations. In this case, societal macrostructures are distinguished from societal microstructures consisting of the situated social interaction of social actors, often described in terms of agency. This distinction in sociology has given rise to the well-known macro-micro debate, in which microsociologists claim the primacy of interaction as the constituents of societal structures, and macrosociologists the primacy of given social structure as a general constraint on interaction.

One important macrostructure is patriarchy, the traditional system of economic and political inequality between women and men in most societies.
