= Cybernetics Society =

The Cybernetics Society or Cybsoc is a UK-based learned society that exists to promote the understanding of Cybernetics and to support the continuous professional development of its members. The society was founded in 1968 by Haneef Fatmi and others. The society was registered in 1976 under the Friendly Societies Act 1974. Members and fellows of the Society can use the post-nominal letters MCybS and FCybS. The society is a member of the International Federation for Systems Research. The society has two official journals: Kybernetes, published by Emerald and adopted as the official journal of the society in 2010, and Enacting Cybernetics, published by the society from 2023 onwards. The society has organized conferences since 1973, as well as other meetings.

== Chairmen and Presidents ==
- 1968-1976 Haneef Fatmi
- 1976-1979 Gordon Pask
- 1979-1984 Igor Aleksander
- 1984-1995 Haneef Fatmi
- 1995-1999 Brian Warburton
- 1999-2020 Martin Smith
- 2020-2024 John Beckford
- 2024-2026 Peter Kawalek
- 2026- Peter Tuddenham

== Honorary Fellows ==
Those awarded honorary fellowship by the Cybernetics Society include:

- Eric Ash
- Horace Barlow
- Anthony Stafford Beer
- Margaret Boden
- James W. Black
- David Deutsch
- John Carew Eccles
- Carmen Hijosa
- James Lovelock
- Fredmund Malik
- Humberto Maturana
- Roger Penrose
- Abdus Salam
- Kevin Warwick.

== Enacting Cybernetics ==
Enacting Cybernetics
- Discipline: Cybernetics
- Language: English
- Edited by: Ben Sweeting

Publication details
- History: 2023–present
- Publisher: The Cybernetics Society, hosted by Ubiquity Press
- Frequency: Continuous
- Open access: Yes

Standard abbreviations
- ISO 4: Enact. Cybern.

Indexing
- ISSN: 2754-5512

Links
- Journal homepage; Online access; Online archive

The society publishes an open access journal, Enacting Cybernetics, hosted by Ubiquity Press. The journal is focused on "exploring and developing the many ways in which cybernetics may be practiced in the world."
