= Robert Rosen (biologist) =

American theoretical biologist

- Born: June 27, 1934; Brooklyn, New York, US
- Died: December 28, 1998 (aged 64); Rochester, New York, US
- Education: University of Chicago
- Scientific career
- Fields: Mathematical biology, Quantum genetics, Biophysics
- Institutions: State University of New York at Buffalo; Dalhousie University
- Academic advisors: Nicolas Rashevsky

Notes
- Dr. Robert Rosen's photo

Robert Rosen (June 27, 1934 – December 28, 1998) was an American theoretical biologist and Professor of Biophysics at Dalhousie University.

== Career ==
Rosen was born on June 27, 1934, in Brownsville (a section of Brooklyn), in New York City. He studied biology, mathematics, physics, philosophy, and history; particularly, the history of science. In 1959 he obtained a PhD in relational biology, a specialization within the broader field of Mathematical Biology, under the guidance of Professor Nicolas Rashevsky at the University of Chicago. He remained at the University of Chicago until 1964, later moving to the University of Buffalo — now part of the State University of New York (SUNY) — at Buffalo on a full associate professorship, while holding a joint appointment at the Center for Theoretical Biology.

His year-long sabbatical in 1970 as a visiting fellow at Robert Hutchins' Center for the Study of Democratic Institutions in Santa Barbara, California was seminal, leading to the conception and development of what he later called Anticipatory Systems Theory, itself a corollary of his larger theoretical work on relational complexity. In 1975, he left SUNY at Buffalo and accepted a position at Dalhousie University, in Halifax, Nova Scotia, as a Killam Research Professor in the Department of Physiology and Biophysics, where he remained until he took early retirement in 1994. He is survived by his wife, a daughter, Judith Rosen, and two sons.

He served as president of the Society for General Systems Research, now known as the International Society for the Systems Sciences (ISSS), in 1980-81.

== Research ==
Rosen's research was concerned with the most fundamental aspects of biology, specifically the questions "What is life?" and "Why are living organisms alive?". A few of the major themes in his work were:

- developing a specific definition of complexity based on category theoretic models of autonomous living organisms
- developing Complex Systems Biology from the point of view of Relational Biology as well as Quantum Genetics
- developing a rigorous theoretical foundation for living organisms as "anticipatory systems"

Rosen believed that the contemporary model of physics - which he showed to be based on a Cartesian and Newtonian formalism suitable for describing a world of mechanisms - was inadequate to explain or describe the behavior of biological systems. Rosen argued that the fundamental question "What is life?" cannot be adequately addressed from within a scientific foundation that is reductionistic. Approaching organisms with reductionistic scientific methods and practices sacrifices the functional organization of living systems in order to study the parts. The whole, according to Rosen, could not be recaptured once the biological organization had been destroyed. By proposing a sound theoretical foundation for studying biological organisation, Rosen held that, rather than biology being a mere subset of the already known physics, it might turn out to provide profound lessons for physics, and also for science in general.

Rosen's work combines sophisticated mathematics with potentially radical new views on the nature of living systems and science. He has been called "biology's Newton." Drawing on set theory, his work has also been considered controversial, raising concerns that some of the mathematical methods he used could lack adequate proof. Rosen's posthumous work Essays on Life Itself (2000) as well as recent monographs by Rosen's student Aloisius Louie have clarified and explained the mathematical content of Rosen's work.

=== Relational biology ===
Rosen's work proposed a methodology which needs to be developed in addition to the current reductionistic approaches to science by molecular biologists. He called this methodology Relational Biology. Relational is a term he correctly attributes to his mentor Nicolas Rashevsky, who published several papers on the importance of set-theoretical relations in biology prior to Rosen's first reports on this subject. Rosen's relational approach to Biology is an extension and amplification of Nicolas Rashevsky's treatment of n-ary relations in, and among, organismic sets that he developed over two decades as a representation of both biological and social "organisms".

Rosen's relational biology maintains that organisms, and indeed all systems, have a distinct quality called organization which is not part of the language of reductionism, as for example in molecular biology, although it is increasingly employed in systems biology. It has to do with more than purely structural or material aspects. For example, organization includes all relations between material parts, relations between the effects of interactions of the material parts, and relations with time and environment, to name a few. Many people sum up this aspect of complex systems by saying that the whole is more than the sum of the parts. Relations between parts and between the effects of interactions must be considered as additional 'relational' parts, in some sense.

Rosen said that organization must be independent from the material particles which seemingly constitute a living system. As he put it:

The human body completely changes the matter it is made of roughly every 8 weeks, through metabolism, replication and repair. Yet, you're still you --with all your memories, your personality... If science insists on chasing particles, they will follow them right through an organism and miss the organism entirely.

— Robert Rosen, as told to his daughter, Ms. Judith Rosen

Rosen's abstract relational biology approach focuses on a definition of living organisms, and all complex systems, in terms of their internal organization as open systems that cannot be reduced to their interacting components because of the multiple relations between metabolic, replication and repair components that govern the organism's complex biodynamics.

He deliberately chose the `simplest' graphs and categories for his representations of Metabolism-Repair Systems in small categories of sets endowed only with the discrete "efficient" topology of sets, envisaging this choice as the most general and less restrictive. It turns out however that the efficient entailments of $(M{,}R)$systems are "closed to efficient cause", or in simple terms the catalysts ("efficient causes" of metabolism, usually identified as enzymes) are themselves products of metabolism, and thus may not be considered, in a strict mathematical sense, as subcategories of the category of sequential machines or automata: in direct contradiction of the French philosopher Descartes' supposition that all animals are only elaborate machines or mechanisms. Rosen stated: "I argue that the only resolution to such problems [of the subject-object boundary and what constitutes objectivity] is in the recognition that closed loops of causation are 'objective'; i.e. legitimate objects of scientific scrutiny. These are explicitly forbidden in any machine or mechanism." Rosen's demonstration of "efficient closure" was to present this clear paradox in mechanistic science, that on the one hand organisms are defined by such causal closures and on the other hand mechanism forbids them; thus we need to revise our understanding of nature. The mechanistic view prevails even today in most of general biology, and most of science, although some claim no longer in sociology and psychology where reductionist approaches have failed and fallen out of favour since the early 1970s. However those fields have yet to reach consensus on what the new view should be, as is also the case in most other disciplines, which struggle to retain various aspects of "the machine metaphor" for living and complex systems.

=== Complexity and complex scientific models: (M,R) systems ===
The clarification of the distinction between simple and complex scientific models became in later years a major goal of Rosen's published reports. Rosen maintained that modeling is at the very essence of science and thought. His book Anticipatory Systems describes, in detail, what he termed the modeling relation. He showed the deep differences between a true modeling relation and a simulation, the latter not based on such a modeling relation.

In mathematical biology he is known as the originator of a class of relational models of living organisms, called $(M{,}R)$ systems, that he devised to capture the minimal capabilities that a material system would need in order to be one of the simplest functional organisms that are commonly said to be "alive". In this kind of system, $M$ stands for the metabolic and $R$ stands for the 'repair' subsystems of a simple organism, for example active 'repair' RNA molecules. Thus, his mode for determining or "defining" life in any given system is a functional, not material, mode; although he did consider in his 1970s published reports specific dynamic realizations of the simplest $(M{,}R)$systems in terms of enzymes ($M$), RNA ($R$), and functional, duplicating DNA (his $\beta$-mapping).

He went, however, even further in this direction by claiming that when studying a complex system, one "can throw away the matter and study the organization" to learn those things that are essential to defining in general an entire class of systems. This has been, however, taken too literally by a few of his former students who have not completely assimilated Robert Rosen's injunction of the need for a theory of dynamic realizations of such abstract components in specific molecular form in order to close the modeling loop for the simplest functional organisms (such as, for example, single-cell algae or microorganisms). He supported this claim (that he actually attributed to Nicolas Rashevsky) based on the fact that living organisms are a class of systems with an extremely wide range of material "ingredients", different structures, different habitats, different modes of living and reproduction, and yet we are somehow able to recognize them all as living, or functional organisms, without being however vitalists.

His approach, just like Rashevsky's latest theories of organismic sets, emphasizes biological organization over molecular structure in an attempt to bypass the structure-functionality relationships that are important to all experimental biologists, including physiologists. In contrast, a study of the specific material details of any given organism, or even of a type of organisms, will only tell us about how that type of organism "does it". Such a study doesn't approach what is common to all functional organisms, i.e. "life". Relational approaches to theoretical biology would therefore allow us to study organisms in ways that preserve those essential qualities that we are trying to learn about, and that are common only to functional organisms.

Robert Rosen's approach belongs conceptually to what is now known as Functional Biology, as well as Complex Systems Biology, albeit in a highly abstract, mathematical form.

=== Quantum Biochemistry and Quantum Genetics ===
Rosen also questioned what he believed to be many aspects of mainstream interpretations of biochemistry and genetics. He objects to the idea that functional aspects in biological systems can be investigated via a material focus. One example: Rosen disputes that the functional capability of a biologically active protein can be investigated purely using the genetically encoded sequence of amino acids. This is because, he said, a protein must undergo a process of folding to attain its characteristic three-dimensional shape before it can become functionally active in the system. Yet, only the amino acid sequence is genetically coded. The mechanisms by which proteins fold are not completely known. He concluded, based on examples such as this, that phenotype cannot always be directly attributed to genotype and that the chemically active aspect of a biologically active protein relies on more than the sequence of amino acids, from which it was constructed: there must be some other important factors at work, that he did not however attempt to specify or pin down.

Certain questions about Rosen's mathematical arguments were raised in a paper authored by Christopher Landauer and Kirstie L. Bellman which claimed that some of the mathematical formulations used by Rosen are problematic from a logical viewpoint. It is perhaps worth noting, however, that such issues were also raised long time ago by Bertrand Russell and Alfred North Whitehead in their famous Principia Mathematica in relation to antinomies of set theory. As Rosen's mathematical formulation in his earlier papers was also based on set theory and the category of sets such issues have naturally re-surfaced. However, these issues have now been addressed by Robert Rosen in his recent book Essays on Life Itself, published posthumously in 2000. Furthermore, such basic problems of mathematical formulations of $(M{,}R)$--systems had already been resolved by other authors as early as 1973 by utilizing the Yoneda lemma in category theory, and the associated functorial construction in categories with (mathematical) structure. Such general category-theoretic extensions of $(M{,}R)$-systems that avoid set theory paradoxes are based on William Lawvere's categorical approach and its extensions to higher-dimensional algebra. The mathematical and logical extension of metabolic-replication systems to generalized $(M{,}R)$-systems, or G-MR, also involved a series of acknowledged letters exchanged between Robert Rosen and the latter authors during 1967—1980s, as well as letters exchanged with Nicolas Rashevsky up to 1972.

Rosen's ideas are becoming increasingly accepted in theoretical biology, and there are several current discussions. One of his main results, as explained in his book Life Itself (1991), was the unexpected conclusion that (M,R) systems cannot be simulated by Turing machines.

Erwin Schrödinger discussed issues of quantum genetics in his famous book of 1945, What Is Life? These were critically discussed by Rosen in Life Itself and in his subsequent book Essays on Life Itself.

== Comparison with other theories of life ==
(M,R) systems constitute just one of several current theories of life, including the chemoton of Tibor Gánti, the hypercycle of Manfred Eigen and Peter Schuster, autopoiesis (or self-building) of Humberto Maturana and Francisco Varela, and the autocatalytic sets of Stuart Kauffman, similar to an earlier proposal by Freeman Dyson. All of these (including (M,R) systems) found their original inspiration in Erwin Schrödinger's book What is Life? but at first they appear to have little in common with one another, largely because the authors did not communicate with one another, and none of them made any reference in their principal publications to any of the other theories. Nonetheless, there are more similarities than may be obvious at first sight, for example between Gánti and Rosen. Until recently there have been almost no attempts to compare the different theories and discuss them together.

== Last Universal Common Ancestor (LUCA) ==
Some authors equate models of the origin of life with LUCA, the Last Universal Common Ancestor of all extant life. This is a serious error resulting from failure to recognize that L refers to the last common ancestor, not to the first ancestor, which is much older: a large amount of evolution occurred before the appearance of LUCA.

Gill and Forterre expressed the essential point as follows:

LUCA should not be confused with the first cell, but was the product of a long period of evolution. Being the "last" means that LUCA was preceded by a long succession of older "ancestors."

== Publications ==
Rosen wrote several books and many articles. A selection of his published books is as follows:

- 1970, Dynamical Systems Theory in Biology New York: Wiley Interscience.
- 1970, Optimality Principles, reissued by Springer in 2013
- 1978, Fundamentals of Measurement and Representation of Natural Systems, Elsevier Science Ltd,
- 1985, Anticipatory Systems: Philosophical, Mathematical and Methodological Foundations. Pergamon Press.
- 1991, Life Itself: A Comprehensive Inquiry into the Nature, Origin, and Fabrication of Life, Columbia University Press

Published posthumously:

- 2000, Essays on Life Itself, Columbia University Press.
- 2012, Anticipatory Systems; Philosophical, Mathematical, and Methodological Foundations, 2nd Edition, Springer
