= Chemoton =

Abstract model for the fundamental unit of life

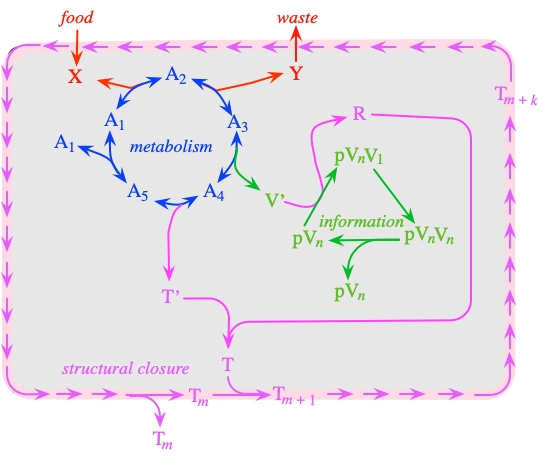
Reaction scheme of the chemoton, showing the interplay of metabolism, information and structural closure. Based on Fig. 1.1 of Gánti (2003)

The term chemoton (short for 'chemical automaton') refers to an abstract model for the fundamental unit of life introduced by Hungarian theoretical biologist Tibor Gánti. Gánti conceived the basic idea in 1952 and formulated the concept in 1971 in his book The Principles of Life (originally written in Hungarian, and translated to English only in 2003). He suggested that the chemoton was the original ancestor of all organisms.

The basic assumption of the model is that life should fundamentally and essentially have three properties: metabolism, self-replication, and a bilipid membrane. The metabolic and replication functions together form an autocatalytic subsystem necessary for the basic functions of life, and a membrane encloses this subsystem to separate it from the surrounding environment. Therefore, any system having such properties may be regarded as alive, and it will be subjected to natural selection and contain a self-sustaining cellular information. Some consider this model a significant contribution to origin of life as it provides a philosophy of evolutionary units.

== Property ==
The chemoton is a protocell that grows by metabolism, reproduces by biological fission, and has at least rudimentary genetic variation. Thus, it contains three subsystems, namely an autocatalytic network for metabolism, a lipid bilayer for structural organisation, and a replicating machinery for information. Unlike cellular metabolic reactions, the metabolism of the chemoton is in an autonomous chemical cycle and is not dependent on enzymes. Autocatalysis produces its own structures and functions. Hence, the process itself has no hereditary variation. However, the model includes another molecule (T in the diagram) that is spontaneously produced and is incorporated into the structure. This molecule is amphipathic like membrane lipids, but it is highly dynamic, leaving small gaps that close and open frequently. This unstable structure is important for new amphipathic molecules to be added, so that a membrane is subsequently formed. This will become a microsphere. Due to metabolic reaction, osmotic pressure will build up inside the microsphere, and this will generate a force for invaginating the membrane, and ultimately division. In fact, this is close to the cell division of cell wall-less bacteria, such as Mycoplasma. Continuous reactions will also invariably produce variable polymers that can be inherited by daughter cells. In the advanced version of the chemoton, the hereditary information will act as a genetic material, something like a ribozyme of the RNA world.

== Significance ==
=== Origin of life ===
The primary use of the chemoton model is in the study of the chemical origin of life. This is because the chemoton itself can be thought of as a primitive or minimal cellular life as it satisfies the definition of what a cell is (that it is a unit of biological activity enclosed by a membrane and capable of self-reproduction). Experimental demonstration showed that a synthesised chemoton can survive in a wide range of chemical solutions, it formed materials for its internal components, it metabolised its chemicals, and it grew in size and multiplied itself.

=== Unit of selection ===
As it is scientifically hypothesised that the first replicating systems must be simple structure, most likely before any enzymes or templates existed, chemoton provides a plausible scenario. As an autocatalytic but non-genetic entity, it predates the enzyme-dependent precursors of life, such as RNA World. But being capable of self-replication and producing variant metabolites, it possibly could be an entity with the first biological evolution, therefore, the origin of the unit of Darwinian selection.

=== Artificial life ===
The chemoton has laid the foundation of some aspects of artificial life. The computational basis has become a topic of software development and experimentation in the investigation of artificial life. The main reason is that the chemoton simplifies the otherwise complex biochemical and molecular functions of living cells. Since the chemoton is a system consisting of a large but fixed number of interacting molecular species, it can effectively be implemented in a process algebra-based computer language.

== Comparison with other theories of life ==
The chemoton is just one of several theories of life, including the hypercycle of Manfred Eigen and Peter Schuster, which includes the concept of quasispecies, the (M,R) systems of Robert Rosen, autopoiesis (or self-building) of Humberto Maturana and Francisco Varela, and the autocatalytic sets of Stuart Kauffman, similar to an earlier proposal by Freeman Dyson. All of these (including the chemoton) found their original inspiration in Erwin Schrödinger's book What is Life? but at first they appear to have little in common with one another, largely because the authors did not communicate with one another, and none of them made any reference in their principal publications to any of the other theories. (Gánti's book does include a mention of Rosen, but this was added as an editorial comment, and was not written by Gánti.) Nonetheless, there are more similarities than may be obvious at first sight, for example between Gánti and Rosen. Until recently there have been almost no attempts to compare the different theories and discuss them together.

== Last Universal Common Ancestor (LUCA) ==
Some authors equate models of the origin of life with LUCA, the Last Universal Common Ancestor of all extant life. This is a serious error resulting from failure to recognize that L refers to the last common ancestor, not to the first ancestor, which is much older: a large amount of evolution occurred before the appearance of LUCA.

Gill and Forterre expressed the essential point as follows:

LUCA should not be confused with the first cell, but was the product of a long period of evolution. Being the "last" means that LUCA was preceded by a long succession of older "ancestors."
