= Hypercycle =

Hypercycle may refer to:

- Hypercycle (chemistry), a kind of reaction network prominent in a theory of the self-organization of matter
- Hypercycle (geometry), a curve in hyperbolic space whose points have the same orthogonal distance from a given straight line
