= Cis-action =

Cis-action or cis-acting is a vague term that, in general, means "an action on the same" in contrast to trans-action "an action on a different". In other words, the initiator of the action is affected by it. Cis-actions occur wherever circular dependencies are present. Most notably in:

- biology, where it refers to life itself as in the selfish gene, cis-acting genetic elements and self-maintenance as a trait of self-replicating entities;
- chemistry, where it is known as autocatalytic set.
- Software engineering, as in computer viruses.
