= Anticipatory Systems =

1985 book by Robert Rosen

Anticipatory systems: Philosophical, mathematical, and methodological foundations
- Author: Robert Rosen
- Language: English
- Subject: Systems biology
- Publisher: Pergamon Press
- Publication date: 1985
- Publication place: United Kingdom
- Pages: x, 436 pages
- ISBN: 978-0-08-031158-6
- OCLC: 11599208

Anticipatory Systems: Philosophical, Mathematical, and Methodological Foundations is a book by Robert Rosen, conceived in the 1970s and published for the first time in 1985. The book describes the way that biological systems anticipate the environment. The book draws from mathematics, in particular category theory, in describing the way systems can anticipate.

The first five chapters of the book are about modeling: Rosen shows that natural systems, physical things in the world, are modeled by formal systems, which are at their heart mathematical. These formal systems simulate the natural systems. But in order to provide anticipatory knowledge, they must produce predictions ahead of the predicted phenomena.

== Publication history ==
The first edition of Anticipatory Systems was published in 1985 by Pergamon Press. The second edition of Anticipatory Systems was published in 2012 by Springer.

== Publication details ==
The second edition includes a fifty-page prolegomena by Mihai Nadin, as well as contributions by Judith Rosen and John J. Kineman. The book is the 27th volume in the International Federation for Systems Research International Series on Systems Science and Engineering, a series edited by George Klir.

== Critical reception ==
A review by Eric Minch of the first edition called the book "radical and profound".

== Related work ==
Rosen followed this book with a text called Life Itself that discussed the mathematical, scientific, and ethical issues related to generating artificial life.

A. H. Louie, one of Rosen's students, published a tutorial article on the book, explaining, among other things, the mathematical concepts behind the book

== Errata for the first edition ==
- Conjunction and disjunction terms are reversed in the text, pages 60–68, but the mathematical expressions are correct.
- Footnote 8 missing from page 384: probably the reference on 382 should be to footnote 7.
- Pages 327 and 328 are swapped.
