= Alliance for the Protection of Nature and Society =

Defunct political party in Hungary

Alliance for the Protection of Nature and Society Természet- és Társadalomvédők Szövetsége
- Leader: Tibor Gánti
- Founded: 6 January 1990
- Dissolved: 9 March 1995
- Ideology: Environmentalism
- Political position: Centre

The Alliance for the Protection of Nature and Society (Hungarian: Természet- és Társadalomvédők Szövetsége; TTVSZ), was a political party in Hungary between 1990 and 1995.

== History ==
The TTVSZ was founded in January 1990 by biochemist and Természet Világa editor-in-chief Tibor Gánti, who also led the party as President of the Coordination Board. The party contested in the 1990 parliamentary election with two individual candidates, who received 0.03 percent of the votes, gaining no seats. The TTVSZ did not participate solely in the 1994 parliamentary election, its leader Gánti ran as a candidate on the national list of the National Democratic Alliance, but did not obtain a mandate.

== Election results ==
=== National Assembly ===
Election year	National Assembly				Government
Election year	# of overall votes	% of overall vote	# of overall seats won	+/–	Government
1990	1,284	0.03%	0 / 386		extra-parliamentary

== Sources ==
- Vida, István (2011). "Természet- és Társadalomvédők Szövetsége (TTVSZ)". Magyarországi politikai pártok lexikona (1846–2010) [Encyclopedia of the Political Parties in Hungary (1846–2010)] (in Hungarian). Gondolat Kiadó. p. 459. ISBN 978-963-693-276-3.
