= Mihai Nadin =

Romanian computer scientist

Mihai Nadin (born February 2, 1938, in Brașov, Romania) is a scholar and researcher in electrical engineering, computer science, aesthetics, semiotics, human-computer interaction (HCI), computational design, post-industrial society, and anticipatory systems. His publications on these topics number over 200, and he has lectured throughout the world.

Currently Mihai Nadin is Professor Emeritus of Computer Science and Interactive Media and Former Ashbel Smith Professor in Interactive Arts, Technology, and Computer Science at the University of Texas at Dallas. He was director of the Institute for Research in Anticipatory Systems.

== Life ==
Born in Brașov, Romania, Nadin was educated under the communist regime imposed after World War II. He studied electrical engineering, telecommunications, and computer science, as well as studying at the Polytechnic University of Bucharest. He took a Master of Science with honors. He studied philosophy at the University of Bucharest, receiving a Master of Arts; then received his doctoral degree with a specialization in aesthetics. He attended LMU Munich, studying for a post-doctoral degree ("Habilitierung") with Wolfgang Stegmüller in Philosophy, Logic, and the Theory of Science. His dissertation was entitled The Semiotic Foundation of Value Theory.

== Human-computer interaction ==
Nadin's contributions to human-computer interaction (HCI) have a strong foundation in semiotics. Based on his work in Peircean semiotics and his training in computer science, Nadin was the first to recognize that the computer was the "semiotic machine par excellence".

== Peircean semiotics ==
A conceptualist, Nadin's first work in semiotics was rather on the theory than in application. Due to the interest of Europeans, especially of Germans under the aegis of Max Bense, Nadin was attracted to the work of the American polymath and philosopher Charles Sanders Peirce. Under the influence of Bense, Nadin's early work in semiotics was dedicated to a rigorous foundation for the advancement of Peirce's semiotic.

== Computers in education ==
At the Rhode Island School of Design, Nadin made a name for himself as one of the first proponents, in the nation, of integrating computers in education. He lectured on the topic around the US and consulted for several institutes of higher education (Rochester Institute of Technology, Illinois Institute of Technology, University of Oregon, Hadassah University in Israel, among others) in setting up programs in art and design with computers.

Prior to the widespread use of the Internet, Nadin developed several computer-aided educational aids. Docent, a HyperCard based software program, was integrated in the CD-ROM for interactive learning. Both Docent and MetaDocent were first developed for the videodisc medium. MetaDocent gave users the possibility to create individualized image/text files. The indexing of image, sound, navigation, and especially the possibility to produce an individualized record (through an integrated Notebook application) were unique at the time

Based on the fact that play is serious work for the very young, Nadin initiated a program in Toy Design at SUNY Fashion Institute of Technology to train designers to develop the minds of the very young through all the senses. He also insisted on integrating the (then) new digital technology into toys for pre-school and school-age children so that they could experience the possibilities of digital technology beyond mere computer games.

== Computational design ==
Nadin has opposed the viewpoint that tools that are extensions of human physical abilities, like the computer, should be considered an extension of the human mind. He founded the world's first program in Computational Design in 1994 at the University of Wuppertal (Germany). Its purpose was twofold: 1. development of a theory of computational design; 2. the design of products and processes through digital means. These products and processes themselves integrate digital technology (they are embedded systems). Thus, the program's long-term goal is the constitution of the world of ubiquitous computing.

== Anticipation ==
Anticipation is the focus of Nadin's most recent research. Parallel to the pioneering work of Robert Rosen regarding anticipatory systems, Nadin researched the anticipatory characteristics of the human mind and anticipatory behaviors. After research at Stanford University, he developed possibilistic models for market processes, auction models, and real-time radio-astronomy data processing.

He founded the antÉ - Institute for Research in Anticipatory Systems in 2002. In 2004, he brought it to the University of Texas at Dallas. A major project involving anticipatory systems is entitled Seneludens, which aims at maintaining anticipatory capabilities in the aging through the creation of virtual interactive environments.

antÉ lab-first known quantification of anticipatory characteristics

The antÉ Lab pursues the quantification of anticipatory characteristics pertinent to human activity, aging, performance evaluation.

In 2012 he founded the Study Group on Anticipation at the Hanse Wissenschaftskolleg/Hanse Institute for Advanced Study (Delmenhorst, Germany).

== Publications ==
- Distrupt Science: The Future Matters
- Anticipation Informed Design
- Anticipation: Learning from the past. The Russian/Soviet contributions to the science of anticipation
- The Interdisciplinary Perspective
- Anticipation and Medicine
- Are You Stupid? A Second Revolution Might Save America from Herself
