= Nat Nichols =

Nat Nichols Nyéki Szabolcs
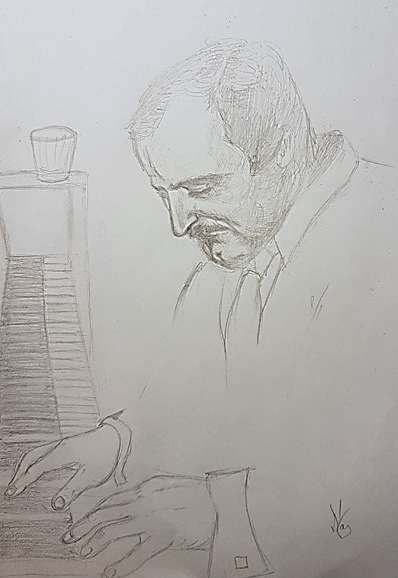

Background information
- Also known as: Illés Miklós
- Born: Szabolcs Nyéki; 1939; Vác, Hungary
- Died: November 24, 2020 (aged 81) U.S.
- Genres: jazz
- Instrument: piano

Nathanael Nichols (born Szabolcs Nyéki; March 8, 1939 – November 24, 2020), better known as Nat Nichols was a composer, jazz pianist and missionary.

== Biography ==
=== Early years ===
Nat Nichols born in 1939 in Vác, Hungary. His father was a wine-maker and bookkeeper in the National Bank of Hungary, his mother was a pianist-teacher of sound and traditional musical background. Nat's grandfather István Kövi was a pupil of Zoltán Kodály, then the conductor-composer-pianist of the Budapest Philharmonic Orchestra and Franz Liszt Conservatory of Budapest. During World War II, Nat's mother was forced by invading Russian soldiers to play waltzes and foxtrots for four hours. The music saved the family. In 1948, when the communists took power, István Kövi refused to become a member of the Communist Party. Consequently, he lost his position. He was arrested and kept in prison for months. His only „crime" consisted of writing a few lines of poetry for the local paper. His family was blacklisted as well. Either Nat could not apply to the Conservatory. Alternately, Nat was trained in classical music by his grandfather. István Kövi set up a small studio apartment, where he spent his rest of his life composing and teaching. Here he would listen to jazz and American popular music on the short-wave radio and make written transcripts of those broadcasts, often from memory. In addition to an aptitude for his keyboard studies young Nat soon demonstrated an ability to pick out jazz melodies of his own and make up his own tunes, thus his love for jazz led him down an other path from classical music.

He started playing professionally with his own combo at the age of 14. During the Hungarian Revolution of 1956 he became a member of the Revolutionary Council of the Váci Hope Association, which was re-established on November. After the fall of the revolution, he left his home and went to the United States of America.

=== Escape from Hungary ===
During the revolution Nat become a freedom fighter. After the fall of the revolution, he fled his home on November 24, 1956, without the knowledge of his parents. He set off for the border with a classmate, Vili, but by train, which was already dangerous at the time. They were captured and brought back to Budapest by a truck. They were locked up for two days, but because they were still minors, they were released, and the two young men had already set out again. A man took them to Esztergom, from where they continued on foot through the mountains to the border. Near the border, in a small village, they found a hay barn and tried to hide there. The farmer noticed them, but gave them food and accommodation, and then they planned to cross the border together. After a stay of three days, they set off. Nat rode a bike while Vili sat on a small motorcycle with the farmer's son. The motorcycle broke down on the way, while Nat waited for his friend at the agreed location. What they had money they wanted to give to the farmer, but it was not accepted. They hid in a pit near the border until, after a long wait in the cold winter, they managed to sneak through separately. They hid in a pit near the border until they managed to sneak through. Across the border, an Austrian man spotted the boys and he helped them further to a collection point there. From there, after one night, they were taken on to a camp in Vienna, where they stayed for three weeks. Here they were asked where to go. Nat and Vili chose America. In a short time, they were put on a warship heading just for America. By January 1, 1957, the boys reached New York city.

=== Career ===
After Nat immigrated, he found himself in a Hungarian refugee enclave in Cleveland, where he soon found work playing in restaurants and clubs. "After a year, I turned to my friend Rudy, another jazz pianist, and said "We aren't going to learn about this country by staying with Hungarians. Let's close our eyes, point to a spot on the map and move there." Nat made a blind stab at Kansas City, Mo and settled there. Later on, his friend moved to Milwaukee and signed with American Artists Corp., which booked him into places all across the Midwest. Nat joined up, too. This tireless touring brought him an unexpected reward in 1962, as Nat was booked into a club in Valparaiso, Indiana. He met his future wife Jeannine here (a student of Valparadiso University). After a short period, they moved to Hawaii Islands, Honolulu, where they started a family, which eventually grew to seven children (five girls and two boys). He settled with his family in a house by Lake Michigan. Nat's career got a head start at the Don the Beachcomber night club and Honolulu Copa Cabana, where he had a chance to back up America's famous vocalist and to play with known artists, Frank Sinatra, Jack Jones, Tony Bennett and Jo Stafford.

Nichols moved to Fort Wayne, Indiana in 1965 and got a regular job in a club called Johny's Nightcap. "I stayed here a few years, recorded a couple of albums with the Nat Nichols Trio. Then I moved to a place outside Chicago. I've been working around there almost 30 years, playing gigs mostly in northeast Indiana." Nat says. His first record album 'Wind from the Danube' (1965) was a musical tribute to and a remembrance of the Hungarian Revolution, commemorating the events with each track (e.g. March for Freedom, Revolution, God bless the Hungarians, Russian take over). In his second album 'Springplay' (1966) Nat showed his ability to play jazz he loved and introduce several of his own composition. He was granted citizenship in 1970. With time Nat grew in composition and play. Many cassette recordings featured his work with different vocalist and jazz musicians joining him both in recordings and on stage. He also appeared in Europe in such places as the London Palladium and the Titania Palace in West Berlin, as well as in Switzerland.

=== Missionary activity ===
He visited his homeland several times, when he brought Christian samizdat publications and gospel music (on magnetic tapes) banned by the communist regime. Nat clashed with the Hungarian authorities over his actions (which were then prohibited). There was an arrest warrant against him. On one occasion, the cassettes were found at the border, so he was arrested on charges of espionage and imprisoned for two days. He was released through a lawyer who was an acquaintance of his parents, but had to leave the country within 24 hours. Returning to the United States, he was notified a few months later that he had been acquitted of espionage. He traveled home again in the 1980s and continued his Christian missionary activities throughout Hungary.

He also broadcast Christian messages from the Transworld Radio station (a transmitter originally built during World War II by the Germans for propaganda purposes in the tiny Riviera country Monaco).

=== Late years ===
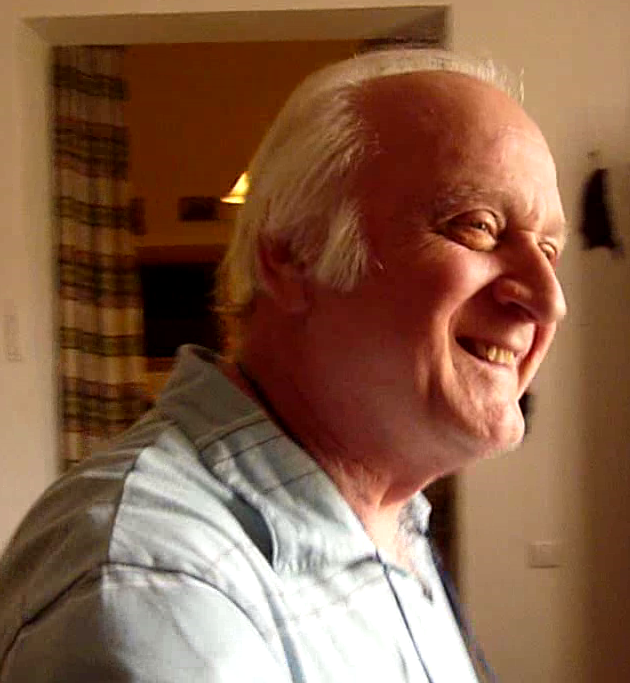
Nat Nichols in 2010

In 1997 he went back to his homeland to Hungary to pursue his musical career in concerts and do more composing. The following year he came out with his first European CD album 'Naturally'. This author edition featured 13 of his new songs, which was followed by the 'Minor traffic' CD with 17 more original tunes. Many of those tunes are printed in a music booklet to be introduced to the jazz musicians and jazz lovers all over. His second wife, Zsuzsa Spányik helped him in managing career in this time.

According to Nat, jazz is essentially a very personal kind of music and each musician must find the tempos and style that 'works' for him, or for her. Nat's conviction that improvisation of jazz is as valid for him as the improvisation of the classical composers was in the past.

Nat Nichols as a performer and as a creative musician stood in the forefront of blending the Afro- and the classical American jazz-sounds in his play and compositions. A schooled musician who has deliberately selected jazz as the medium for expressing himself in his creativity and talent.

In his old age, one hand was paralyzed, so he gave up making music and moved back to the United States. In his last jazz performance, he performed "Georgia on My Mind".

He died in the United States on November 24, 2020.

== Discography ==
- Wind from the Danube (1965–66) – CD
- Cheek to Cheek (1997) – CD with Lynn Lawson
- The Blues CD (1998) – CD with Kathy Hogan
- Naturally (2000) – CD
- Minor Traffic (2001) – CD
- Codex (2002) – CD
- Blue Horison (2003) – CD with Lynn Lawson & Kathy Hogan
- The Very Best of Nat Nichols Trio – Cassette

== General sources ==
- Nat Nichols' most popular song: "Hello Again New York" on YouTube
- One of Nat Nichols' gospel songs: "Hallelujah Gospel Songs - 10 Szám" on YouTube
- "Local nite spots offer top entertainment". Indianapolis Recorder, Indianapolis, Marion County, 16 January 1965, page 12.
- "Saint Francis College", Indianapolis Star, Indianapolis, Indiana USA. 1967
