= BiosGroup =

American software company

BiosGroup is a Santa Fe, New Mexico-based for-profit company founded in 1997 by Stuart Kauffman and Ernst & Young (now Capgemini Ernst and Young) which aimed to commercialize complexity science software in applications that helped companies manage projects and supply chains. BiosGroup was a spin-off from the Santa Fe Institute. Its clients included Southwest Airlines, P&G, Ford, Boeing, SAP AG and Texas Instruments; as well as government agencies like the Office of Naval Research and the Internal Revenue Service. In 2000, it received investments of $5 million from Procter & Gamble and $8 million from Ford Motor Company.

At its peak, BiosGroup employed about 150 people in offices in Santa Fe, Boston, London, Bulgaria, and Washington, DC. BiosGroup spun off several prospering companies including: eXchange Advantage; Qforma (previously Commodicast); Icosystem; Genpathway (previously CIStem); and EuroBios SA.

BiosGroup's consulting operations were acquired by NuTech Solutions in 2003.

== See also ==
- Supply chain system
- Santa Fe Institute
