= Vác =

- Town
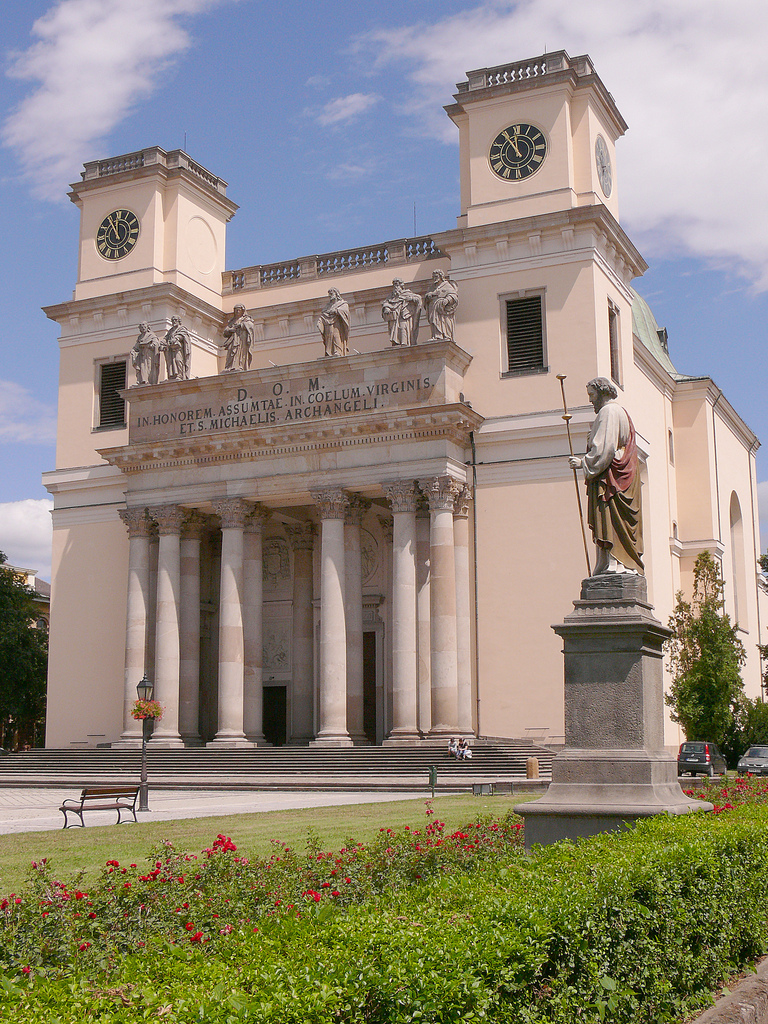
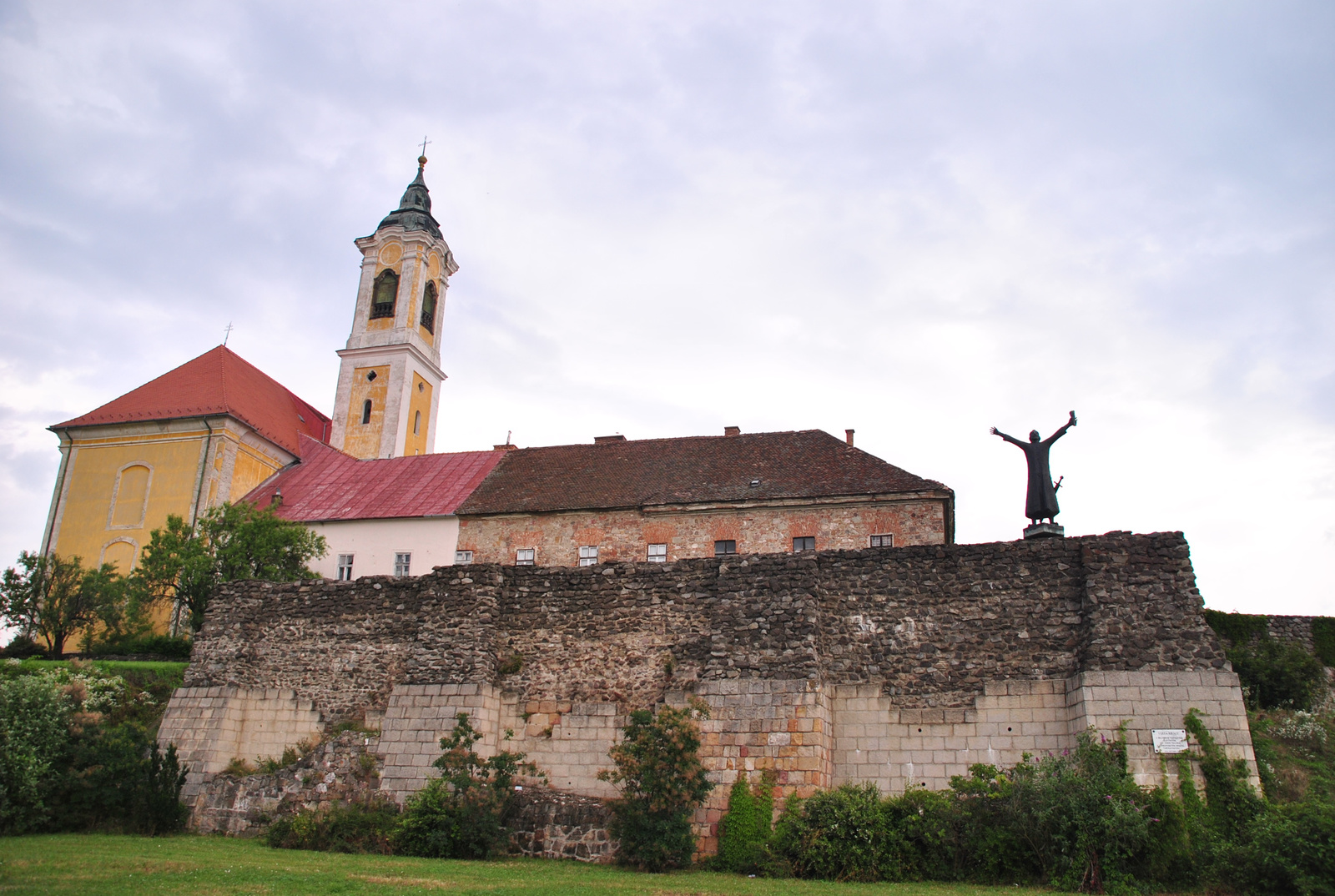
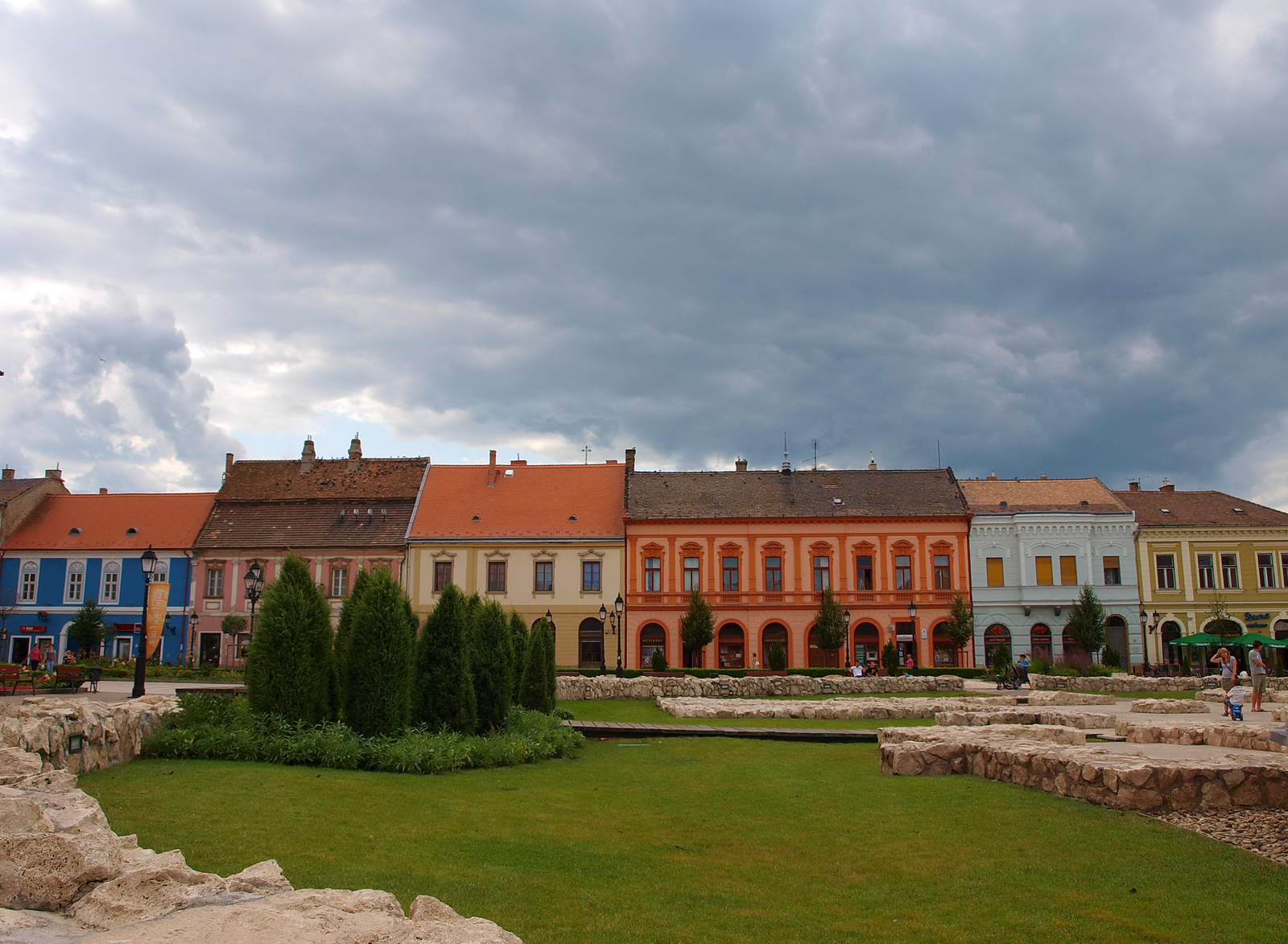
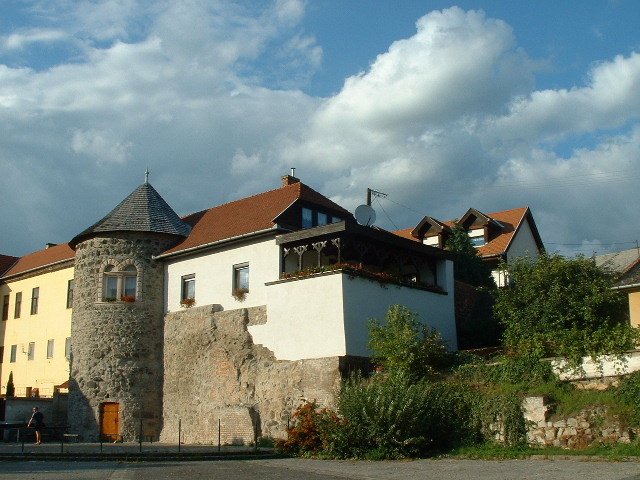
- Vác Cathedral (upper left) and other locations in Vác

- Flag Coat of arms

- Location of Vác Vác (Europe)
- Coordinates: 47.77518°N 19.13102°E
- Country: Hungary
- County: Pest
- District: Vác

Government
  - Mayor: Ilona Matkovich (Independent)

Area
  - Total: 61.60 km^{2} (23.78 sq mi)

Population (2013)
  - Total: 33,475
  - Density: 543/km^{2} (1,410/sq mi)
- Time zone: UTC+1 (CET)
  - Summer (DST): UTC+2 (CEST)
- Postal code: 2600
- Area code: 27

Vác (Hungarian pronunciation: [ˈvaːt͡s]; German: Waitzen; Yiddish: ווייצען) is a thousand-year old city in Pest county in Hungary with approximately 35,000 inhabitants. The archaic spelling of the name is Vácz.

== Location ==
Vác is located 35 kilometres (22 miles) north of the capital Budapest on the eastern bank of the Danube river, below the bend where the river changes course and flows south. The town is seated at the foot of the Naszály Mountain in the foothills of the Carpathians.

== Modern Vác ==
Vác is a commercial center as well as a popular summer resort for citizens of Budapest. The Vác Cathedral, built 1761–1777, was modelled after St. Peter's Basilica in Rome. The episcopal palace houses a museum for Roman and medieval artifacts. The city is also known for its 18th-century arch of triumph and for its beautiful baroque city center. The annual festival Váci Világi Vigalom takes place in the city, featuring hungarian bands, and international acts such as Nazareth (band) in 2019 and Ken Hensley in 2018

== History ==
Settlement in Vác dating as far back as the Roman Empire has been found. The origin of its name is debated. One hypothesis says that the name comes from a Hungarian tribal name "Vath".

It has been the seat of a Roman Catholic bishopric since the 11th century. Bishops from the Roman Catholic Diocese of Vác were influential within the Kingdom of Hungary, with many serving as chancellors or later becoming archbishops.

On 17 March 1241, in the First Mongol invasion of Hungary, the population was slaughtered and Mongols set up camp there. After the departure of the Mongols, Vác was rebuilt and German colonists were invited to the town. The town was conquered by the Ottoman Empire in 1541. During the Habsburg monarchy's wars against the Ottomans, the Austrians won victories against the Turks at Vác in 1597 and in 1684. After the Great Turkish War, Vác was rebuilt and repopulated. This re-population was both spontaneous and planned. According to the Truce of Zsitvatörök, Habsburg control of the fortress at Vác (also known as Vacz) was maintained, and its repair was sanctioned.

During the Hungarian Revolution and War of Independence of 1848-49, the Honvédség routed the Austrian forces stationed in the city after a major battle (April 10, 1849); the Second Battle of Vác ended in Russian victory (July 17).

During World War II, Vác was captured on 8 December 1944 by Soviet troops of the 2nd Ukrainian Front in the course of the Budapest Offensive.

== Demographics ==
=== Ethnicity ===
- Hungarians : 94.9%
- Romani people : 1.3%
- Germans : 0.5%
- Romanians : 0.1%
- Slovaks : 0.5%
- Ukrainians : 0.1%
- Other/Undeclared: 4.5%

=== Religious denomination ===
- Roman Catholic: 59.4%
- Greek Catholic: 0.7%
- Calvinist: 9.3%
- Lutheran: 3.1%
- Other denomination: 1.4%
- Non-religious: 14.4%
- Undeclared: 11.5%

According to the 1910 census, the religious make-up of the town was the following:

- Roman Catholic: 76.3%
- Jewish: 11.2%
- Calvinist: 8.3%
- Lutheran: 2.8%
- Other denomination: 1.4%

== Notable people ==
- Géza I, King of Hungary
- Tibor Gánti, theoretical biologist and biochemist
- Nat Nichols, componist, jazz pianist and missionary.
- Imre Madách writer and poet, most famous for writing The Tragedy of Man

== Twin towns – sister cities ==
Vác is twinned with:

- Deuil-la-Barre, France
- Donaueschingen, Germany
- Dubnica nad Váhom, Slovakia
- Givatayim, Israel
- Järvenpää, Finland
- Odorheiu Secuiesc, Romania
- Otrokovice, Czech Republic
- Šahy, Slovakia
- Sarıyer, Turkey
- Tiachiv, Ukraine
- Zawadzkie, Poland

== Gallery ==
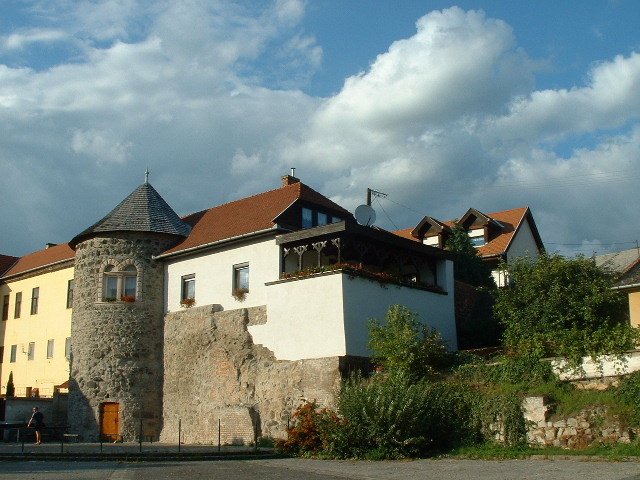
The Sharpened Tower - single remaining tower of the Castle of Vác

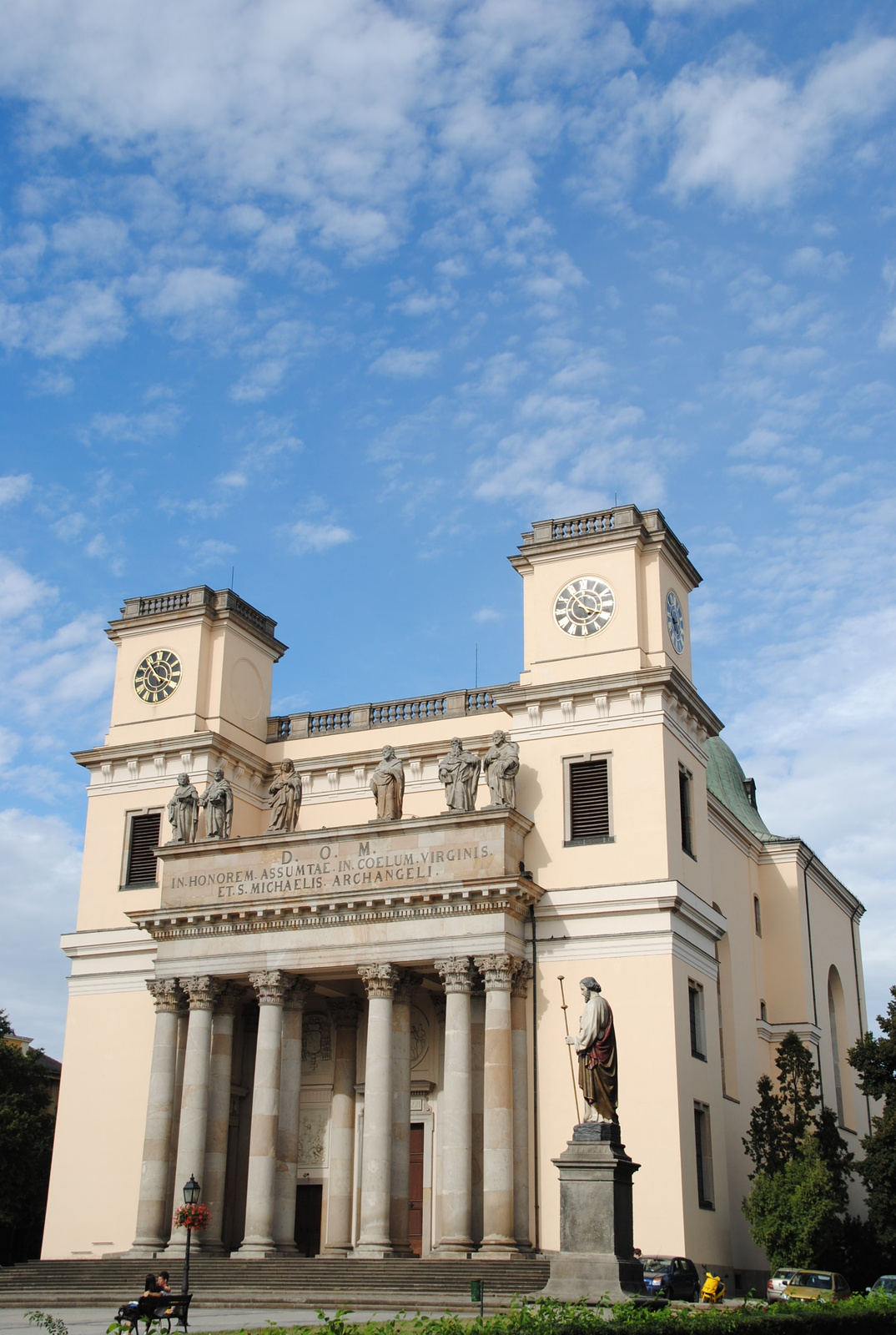
Dom - Cathedral of Vác. Built in early classicist style, it was the first iteration of this new architectural movement in Hungary.

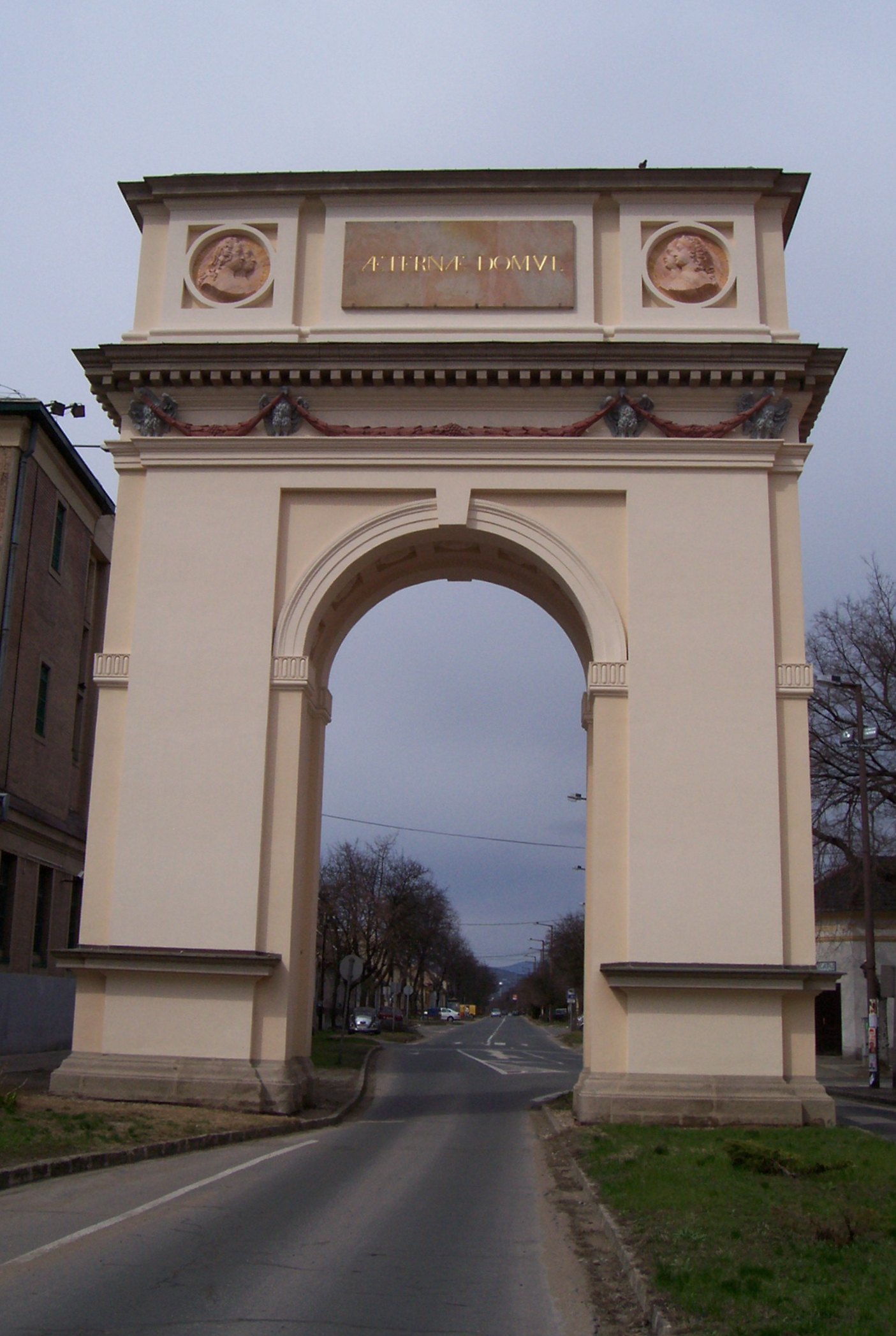
The Arc of Triumph built for Empress Maria Theresia's visit in 1764. It is the only arch of triumph in Hungary.
