= Cooperative strategy =

Cooperative Strategy refers to a planning strategy in which two or more firms work together in order to achieve a common objective. Several companies apply cooperative strategies to increase their profits through cooperation with other companies that stop being competitors.

A cooperative strategy gives a company advantages, specially to companies that have a lack of competitiveness, know how or resources. This strategy gives to the company the possibility to fulfill the lack of competitiveness.

Cooperative strategy also offers access to new and wider market to companies and the possibility of learning through cooperation. Cooperative strategy has been recently applied by companies that want to open their markets and have a liberalist vision of negotiation through cooperation.

== Strategic alliance ==
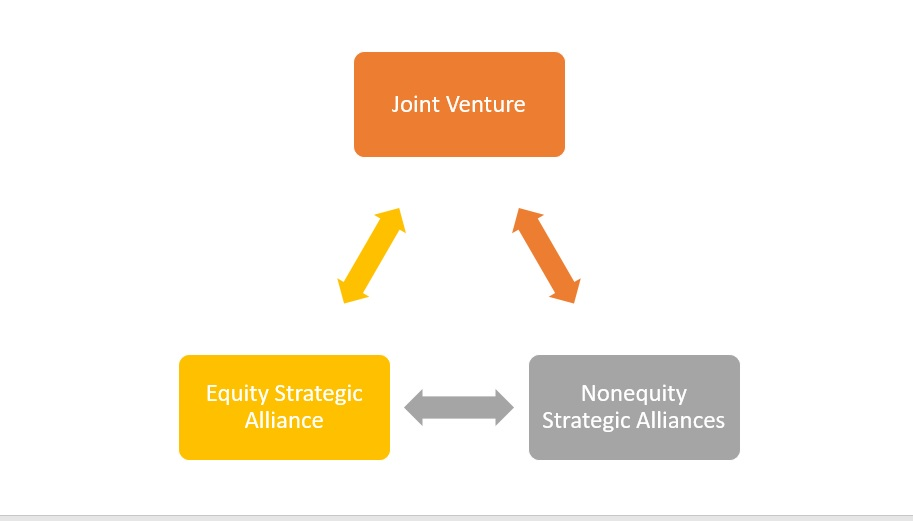
Types of Strategic Alliances

The main way to apply cooperative strategies are through strategic alliances in which firms use their resources and knowledge to create a competitive advantage. There are three types of strategic alliances.

- Joint venture
- Equity strategic alliance
- Nonequity strategic alliances

=== Joint venture ===
A joint venture is a shared equity firm wherein the participant commit the same quantity of resources, this means that this legally independent new company share resources, capabilities and risks to achieve a competitive advantage. An example of a joint venture is the case of Facebook and Skype in 2011 that sign a Strategic Alliance that gave Facebook economic benefits and let Microsoft to open its market and move forward the social network market.

=== Equity strategic alliance ===
In this type of strategic alliance, each company owns a part of the venture that they created, it is important to mention that every part must be equal to be considered an equity strategic alliance. Using this strategic alliance each of the parts share all the benefits but also all the risks. In 2013 Fly Emirates made an Equity Strategi Alliance with Jet Airways both companies made an investment of $379 million in order that each company can get benefits of this alliance.

=== Nonequity strategic alliance ===
Nonequity strategic alliance refers to a type of cooperation wherein two or more companies establish a contractual relation which specifies that each company will share their resources and knowledge to achieve competitive advantage. In this case cooperation is not totally equal because each company will share only the resources that are convenient and this could cause that a company lose more than the others.Geringer and Herbert in 1989 made a nonequity strategic alliance that did not work because of the concept because each company chose how much to contribute, and in many cases this means that companies would not take risks, and this affects the alliance.

=== Develop strategic alliances ===
Companies develop strategic alliances for different reasons:

- Firms create strategic alliances because it has a lack of resources or knowledge to achieve their objectives.
- Cooperative behavior gives a company values that can not be achieved independently.
- Reach stakeholders interests to reduce uncertainty inside the company.
- Strategic alliances can lead to new sources of revenues.
- Cooperation can improve the image of the company.
- Alliances can improve the capabilities of the company to respond to the changes of the market and changes in the ways of production.
- Strategic alliances offers opportunities to the company to acquire knowledge and experience.

=== According to market type ===
==== Slow-cycle markets ====
In markets that are restricted and that have constant changes. An alliance can increase competitiveness because the partner can understand and adapt to the market.

==== Fast-cycle markets ====
Fast-cycle markets have the characteristic of having companies with excess of resources and capabilities and an alliance can improve the way of entry to this market.

==== Standard-cycle markets ====
In this type of market alliances usually happen between companies that use economy of scales that ensure benefits, experiences and knowledge to both sides.
