= NAD+ synthase =

Enzyme

NAD^{+} synthetase

Identifiers
- EC no.: 6.3.1.5
- CAS no.: 9032-69-3

Databases
- IntEnz: IntEnz view
- BRENDA: BRENDA entry
- ExPASy: NiceZyme view
- KEGG: KEGG entry
- MetaCyc: metabolic pathway
- PRIAM: profile
- PDB structures: RCSB PDB PDBe PDBsum
- Gene Ontology: AmiGO / QuickGO
Search
- PMC: articles
- PubMed: articles
- NCBI: proteins

In enzymology, a NAD^{+} synthetase (EC 6.3.1.5) is an enzyme that catalyzes the chemical reaction

ATP + deamido-NAD^{+} + NH_{3} $\rightleftharpoons$ AMP + diphosphate + NAD^{+}

The 3 substrates of this enzyme are ATP, deamido-NAD^{+}, and NH_{3}, whereas its 3 products are AMP, diphosphate, and NAD^{+}.

This enzyme belongs to the family of ligases, specifically those forming carbon-nitrogen bonds as acid-D-ammonia (or amine) ligases (amide synthetase). The systematic name of this enzyme class is deamido-NAD^{+}:ammonia ligase (AMP-forming). Other names in common use include NAD^{+} synthetase, NAD^{+} synthetase, nicotinamide adenine dinucleotide synthetase, and diphosphopyridine nucleotide synthetase. This enzyme participates in nicotinate and nicotinamide metabolism and nitrogen metabolism.

== Structural studies ==
As of late 2007, 11 structures have been solved for this class of enzymes, with PDB accession codes 1WXE, 1WXF, 1WXG, 1WXH, 1WXI, 1XNG, 1XNH, 2E18, 2PZ8, 2PZA, and 2PZB.
