= Stuart Kauffman =

American medical doctor & academic

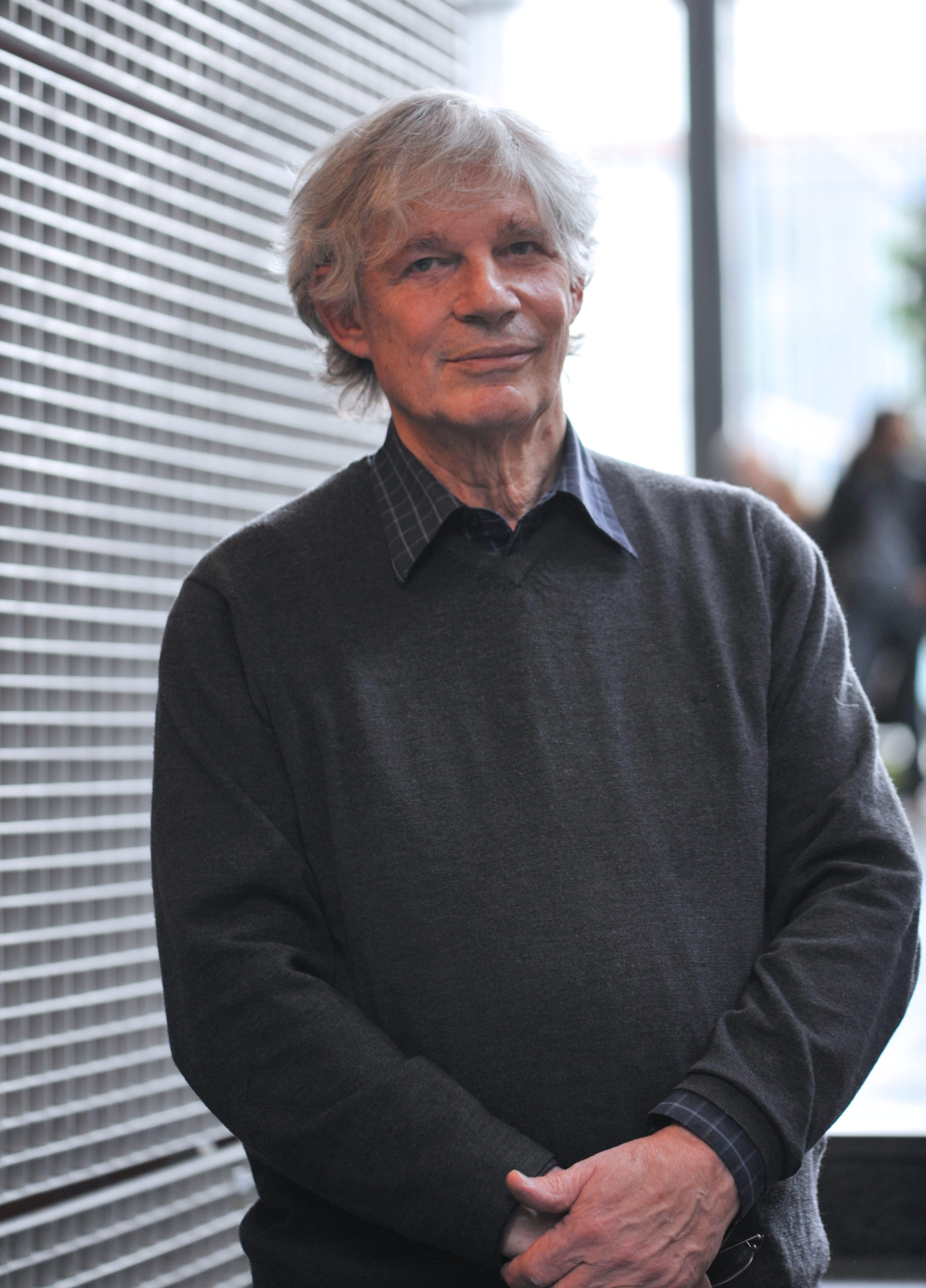
- Stuart Kauffman in April 2010
- Born: September 28, 1939 (age 87); Sacramento
- Education: Dartmouth College; Oxford University; University of California, San Francisco
- Known for: NK model, autocatalytic sets in origin of life, gene regulatory networks, adjacent possible, poised realm
- Awards: Wiener Medal (1969); Marshall Scholar; MacArthur Fellow
- Scientific career
- Workplaces: University of Chicago; University of Pennsylvania; University of Calgary

Stuart Alan Kauffman (born September 28, 1939) is an American medical doctor, theoretical biologist, and complex systems researcher who studies the origin of life on Earth. He was a professor at the University of Chicago, University of Pennsylvania, and University of Calgary. He is currently emeritus professor of biochemistry at the University of Pennsylvania and affiliate faculty at the Institute for Systems Biology. He has a number of awards including a MacArthur Fellowship and a Wiener Medal.

He is best known for arguing that the complexity of biological systems and organisms might result as much from self-organization and far-from-equilibrium dynamics as from Darwinian natural selection, as discussed in his book Origins of Order (1993). In 1967 and 1969 he used random Boolean networks to investigate generic self-organizing properties of gene regulatory networks, proposing that cell types are dynamical attractors in gene regulatory networks and that cell differentiation can be understood as transitions between attractors. Recent evidence suggests that cell types in humans and other organisms are attractors. In 1971 he suggested that a zygote may not be able to access all the cell type attractors in its gene regulatory network during development and that some of the developmentally inaccessible cell types might be cancer cell types. This suggested the possibility of "cancer differentiation therapy". He also proposed the self-organized emergence of collectively autocatalytic sets of polymers, specifically peptides, for the origin of molecular reproduction, which have found experimental support.

== Education and early career ==
Kauffman graduated from Dartmouth in 1960, was awarded the BA (Hons) by Oxford University (where he was a Marshall Scholar) in 1963, and completed a medical degree (M.D.) at the University of California, San Francisco in 1968. After completing his internship, he moved into developmental genetics of the fruit fly, holding appointments first at the University of Chicago from 1969 to 1973, the National Cancer Institute from 1973 to 1975, and then at the University of Pennsylvania from 1975 to 1994, where he rose to professor of biochemistry and biophysics.

== Career ==
Kauffman became known through his association with the Santa Fe Institute (a non-profit research institute dedicated to the study of complex systems), where he was faculty in residence from 1986 to 1997, and through his work on models in various areas of biology. These included autocatalytic sets in origin of life research, gene regulatory networks in developmental biology, and fitness landscapes in evolutionary biology. With Marc Ballivet, Kauffman holds the founding broad biotechnology patents in combinatorial chemistry and applied molecular evolution, first issued in France in 1987, in England in 1989, and later in North America.

In 1996, with Ernst and Young, Kauffman started BiosGroup, a Santa Fe, New Mexico-based for-profit company that applied complex systems methodology to business problems. BiosGroup was acquired by NuTech Solutions in early 2003. NuTech was bought by Netezza in 2008, and later by IBM.

From 2005 to 2009 Kauffman held a joint appointment at the University of Calgary in biological sciences, physics, and astronomy. He was also an adjunct professor in the Department of Philosophy at the University of Calgary. He was an iCORE (Informatics Research Circle of Excellence) chair and the director of the Institute for Biocomplexity and Informatics. Kauffman was also invited to help launch the Science and Religion initiative at Harvard Divinity School; serving as visiting professor in 2009.

In January 2009 Kauffman became a Finland Distinguished Professor (FiDiPro) at Tampere University of Technology, Department of Signal Processing. The appointment ended in December, 2012. The subject of the FiDiPro research project is the development of delayed stochastic models of genetic regulatory networks based on gene expression data at the single molecule level.

In January 2010 Kauffman joined the University of Vermont faculty where he continued his work for two years with UVM's Complex Systems Center. From early 2011 to April 2013, Kauffman was a regular contributor to the NPR Blog 13.7, Cosmos and Culture, with topics ranging from the life sciences, systems biology, and medicine, to spirituality, economics, and the law.

In May 2013 he joined the Institute for Systems Biology, in Seattle, Washington. Following the death of his wife, Kauffman cofounded Transforming Medicine: The Elizabeth Kauffman Institute.

In 2014, Kauffman with Samuli Niiranen and Gabor Vattay was issued a founding patent on the poised realm (see below), an apparently new "state of matter" hovering reversibly between quantum and classical realms.

In 2015, he was invited to help initiate a general a discussion on rethinking economic growth for the United Nations. Around the same time, he did research with University of Oxford professor Teppo Felin.

== Fitness landscapes ==
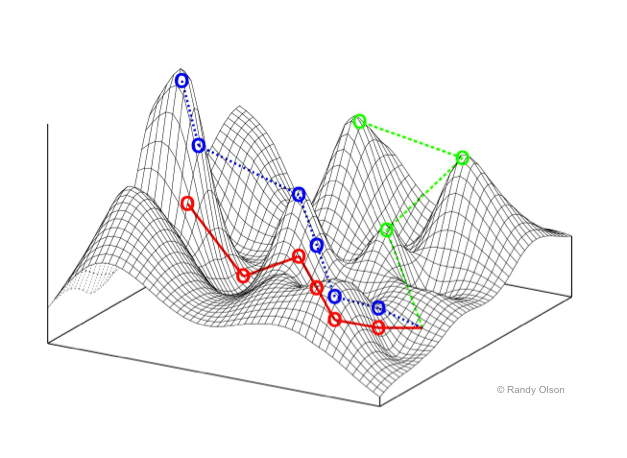
Visualization of two dimensions of a NK fitness landscape. The arrows represent various mutational paths that the population could follow while evolving on the fitness landscape.

Kauffman's NK model defines a combinatorial phase space, consisting of every string (chosen from a given alphabet) of length $N$. For each string in this search space, a scalar value (called the fitness) is defined. If a distance metric is defined between strings, the resulting structure is a landscape.

Fitness values are defined according to the specific incarnation of the model, but the key feature of the NK model is that the fitness of a given string $S$ is the sum of contributions from each locus $S_i$ in the string:

$$F(S) = \sum_i f(S_i),$$

and the contribution from each locus in general depends on the value of $K$ other loci:

$$f(S_i) = f(S_i, S^i_1, \dots, S^i_K), \,$$

where $S^i_j$ are the other loci upon which the fitness of $S_i$ depends.

Hence, the fitness function $f(S_i, S^i_1, \dots, S^i_K)$ is a mapping between strings of length K + 1 and scalars, which Weinberger's later work calls "fitness contributions". Such fitness contributions are often chosen randomly from some specified probability distribution.

In 1991, Weinberger published a detailed analysis of the case in which $1 << k \le N$ and the fitness contributions are chosen randomly. His analytical estimate of the number of local optima was later shown to be flawed. However, numerical experiments included in Weinberger's analysis support his analytical result that the expected fitness of a string is normally distributed with a mean of approximately $\mu + \sigma \sqrt{{2 \ln (k+1)} \over {k+1}}$ and a variance of approximately ${{(k+1)\sigma^2} \over {N[k+1 + 2(k+2)\ln(k+1)]}}$.

== Recognition and awards ==
Kauffman held a MacArthur Fellowship between 1987 and 1992. He also holds an Honorary Degree in Science from the University of Louvain (1997); He was awarded the Norbert Wiener Memorial Gold Medal for Cybernetics in 1973, the Gold Medal of the Accademia dei Lincei in Rome in 1990, the Trotter Prize for Information and Complexity in 2001, and the Herbert Simon award for Complex Systems in 2013. He became a Fellow of the Royal Society of Canada in 2009.

== Works ==
Kauffman is best known for arguing that the complexity of biological systems and organisms might result as much from self-organization and far-from-equilibrium dynamics as from Darwinian natural selection in three areas of evolutionary biology, namely population dynamics, molecular evolution, and morphogenesis.

Borrowing from spin glass models in physics, Kauffman invented "N-K" fitness landscapes, which have found applications in biology and economics. In related work, Kauffman and colleagues have examined subcritical, critical, and supracritical behavior in economic systems.

Kauffman's work translates his biological findings to the mind-body problem and issues in neuroscience, proposing attributes of a new "poised realm" that hovers indefinitely between quantum coherence and classicality. He published on this topic in his paper "Answering Descartes: beyond Turing". With Giuseppe Longo and Maël Montévil, he wrote (January 2012) "No Entailing Laws, But Enablement in the Evolution of the Biosphere", which argued that evolution is not "law entailed" like physics.

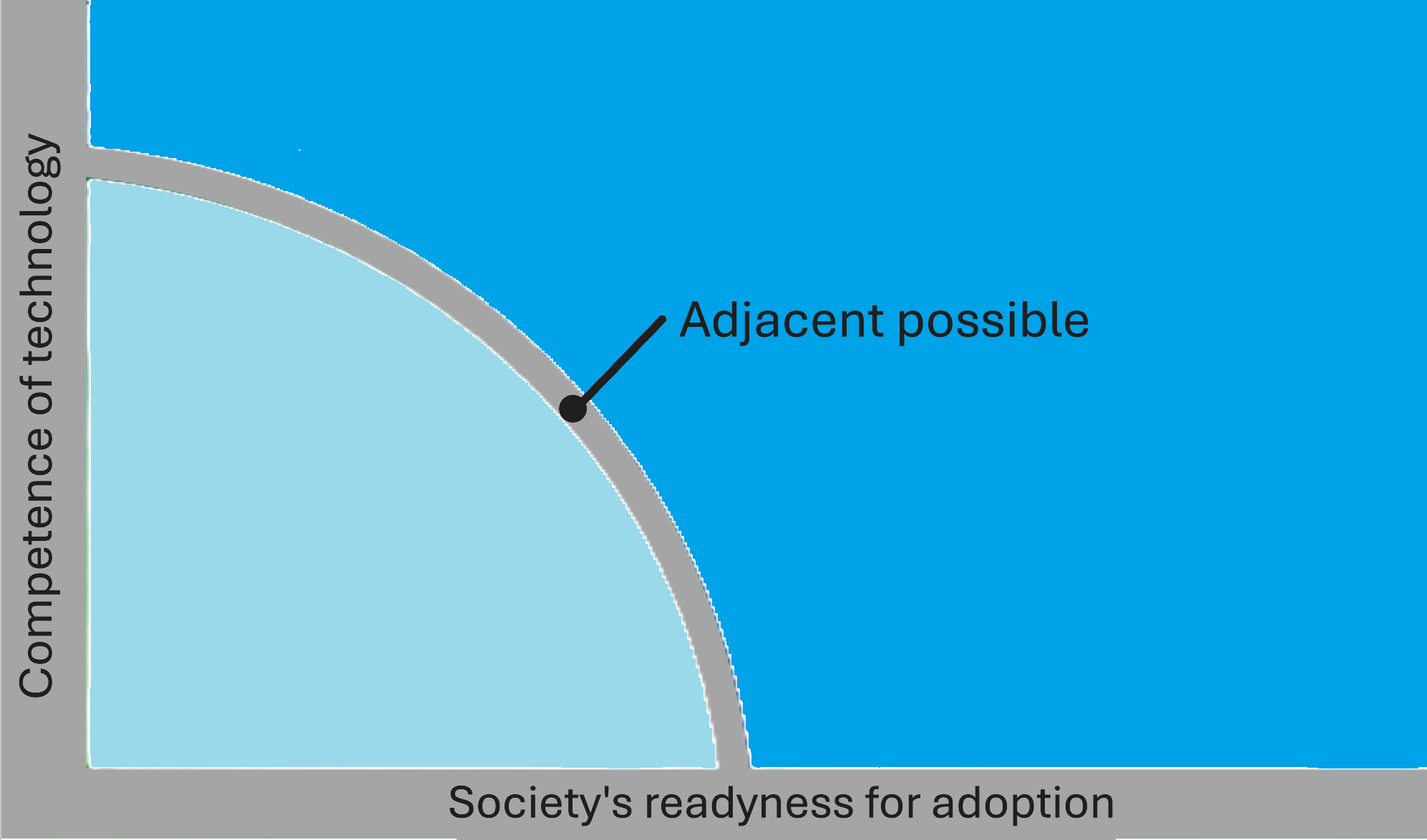
A diagram illustrating the "adjacent possible" concept, with a curved gray line dividing a blue background into two sections. The x-axis is labeled "Society's readiness for adoption," and the y-axis is labeled "Competence of technology." A black dot labeled "Adjacent possible" marks the intersection of the curve, indicating the optimal point where technological capability and societal acceptance align for successful innovation.

Kauffman's work is posted on Physics ArXiv, including "Beyond the Stalemate: Mind/Body, Quantum Mechanics, Free Will, Possible Panpsychism, Possible Solution to the Quantum Enigma" (October 2014) and "Quantum Criticality at the Origin of Life" (February 2015).

Kauffman has contributed to the emerging field of cumulative technological evolution by introducing a mathematics of the adjacent possible.

He has published over 350 articles and 6 books: The Origins of Order (1993), At Home in the Universe (1995), Investigations (2000), Reinventing the Sacred (2008), Humanity in a Creative Universe (2016), and A World Beyond Physics (2019).

In 2016, Kauffman wrote a children's story, "Patrick, Rupert, Sly & Gus Protocells", a narrative about unprestatable niche creation in the biosphere, which was later produced as a short animated video.

In 2017, exploring the concept that reality consists of both ontologically real "possibles" (res potentia) and ontologically real "actuals" (res extensa), Kauffman co-authored, with Ruth Kastner and Michael Epperson, "Taking Heisenberg's Potentia Seriously".

In 2023 the book Evolution "On Purpose": Teleonomy in Living Systems co-edited by Kauffman along with Peter Corning, Addy Pross, Denis Noble, James A. Shapiro and Richard I. Vane-Wright stated in the introduction that "Teleonomy in living systems is not, after all, only "apparent". It is a fundamental fact of life."

== Criticism ==
With respect to molecular biology, Kauffman's structuralist approach has been criticized for ignoring the role of energy in driving biochemical reactions in cells, which can fairly be called self-catalyzing but which do not simply self-organize. Some biologists and physicists working in Kauffman's area have questioned his claims about self-organization and evolution. A case in point is some comments in the 2001 book Self-Organization in Biological Systems. Roger Sansom's 2011 book Ingenious Genes: How Gene Regulation Networks Evolve to Control Development is an extended criticism of Kauffman's model of self-organization in relation to gene regulatory networks.

== Bibliography ==
Selected articles

- Kauffman, S. A.; McCulloch, W. S. (1967). Random Nets of Formal Genes (Technical report). Quarterly Progress Report 34. Cambridge, MA: Research Laboratory of Electronics, Massachusetts Institute of Technology.
- Kauffman, Stuart (1969). "Metabolic stability and epigenesis in randomly constructed genetic nets". Journal of Theoretical Biology. 22 (3): 437–467. Bibcode:1969JThBi..22..437K. doi:10.1016/0022-5193(69)90015-0. PMID 5803332.
- Kauffman, S. A. (1971a). "Cellular Homeostasis, Epigenesis, and Replication in Randomly Aggregated Macromolecular Systems". Journal of Cybernetics. 1 (1): 71–96. doi:10.1080/01969727108545830.
- Kauffman, S. A. (1971b). "Differentiation of Malignant to Benign Cells". Journal of Theoretical Biology. 31 (3): 429–451. Bibcode:1971JThBi..31..429K. doi:10.1016/0022-5193(71)90020-8. PMID 5556142.
- Kauffman, Stuart (August 1991). "Antichaos and Adaptation" (PDF). Scientific American. 265 (2): 78–84. Bibcode:1991SciAm.265b..78K. doi:10.1038/scientificamerican0891-78. PMID 1862333.
- Kauffman, S. A.; Johnsen, S (1991). "Co-Evolution to the Edge of Chaos: Coupled Fitness Landscapes, Poised States, and Co-Evolutionary Avalanches" (PDF). Journal of Theoretical Biology. 149 (4): 467–505. Bibcode:1991JThBi.149..467K. doi:10.1016/s0022-5193(05)80094-3. PMID 2062105.
- Kauffman, Stuart (2004). "Autonomous Agents". In Barrow, John D.; Davies, Paul C. W.; Harper, Charles L. Jr. (eds.). Science and Ultimate Reality: Quantum Theory, Cosmology, and Complexity. Cambridge University Press. ISBN 978-0-521-83113-0.
- Kauffman, Stuart (2004). "Prolegomenon to a General Biology". In Dembski, William A.; Ruse, Michael (eds.). Debating Design: From Darwin to DNA. Cambridge University Press. ISBN 978-1-139-45961-7.
- Kauffman, Stuart A. (November 12, 2006). "Beyond reductionism: Reinventing The Sacred". Edge.com. Edge Foundation.
- Hanel, R.; Kauffman, S. A.; Thurner, S. (2007). "Towards a Physics of Evolution: Critical Diversity Dynamics at the Edges of Collapse and Bursts of Diversification". Physical Review E. 76 (3) 036110. arXiv:physics/0703103. Bibcode:2007PhRvE..76c6110H. doi:10.1103/physreve.76.036110. PMID 17930309.
- Kauffman, Stuart (May 7, 2008). "Why Humanity Needs a God of Creativity". New Scientist. 198 (2655): 52–53. doi:10.1016/s0262-4079(08)61171-9.
- Nykter, M.; Price, N. D.; Aldana, M.; Ramsey, S. A.; Kauffman, S. A.; Hood, L.; Yli-Harja, O.; Shmulevich, I. (2008). "Gene Expression Dynamics in the Macrophage Exhibit Criticality". Proc Natl Acad Sci USA. 105 (6): 1897–1900. Bibcode:2008PNAS..105.1897N. doi:10.1073/pnas.0711525105. PMC 2538855. PMID 18250330.
- Huang, S.; Hu, L.; Kauffman, S.; Zhang, W.; Shmulevich, I. (2009). "Using cell fate attractors to uncover transcriptional regulation of HL60 neutrophil differentiation". BMC Systems Biology. 3 (1): 20. doi:10.1186/1752-0509-3-20. PMC 2652435. PMID 19222862.
- Huang, S.; Kauffman, S. A. (2009). "Complex Gene Regulatory Networks - from Structure to Biological Observables: Cell Fate Determination". In Meyers, R. A. (ed.). Encyclopedia of Complexity and Systems Science. Springer. ISBN 978-0-387-75888-6.
- Kauffman, S. A. (2011). "Approaches to the Origin of Life on Earth". Life. 1 (1): 34–48. Bibcode:2011Life....1...34K. doi:10.3390/life1010034. PMC 4187126. PMID 25382055.
- Longo, G.; Montévil, M.; Kauffman, S. (January 2012). "No entailing laws, but enablement in the evolution of the biosphere". arXiv:1201.2069 [q-bio.OT].
- Kauffman, Stuart; Hill, Colin; Hood, Leroy; Huang, Sui (2014b). "Transforming Medicine: A Manifesto". Scientific American Worldview. Archived from the original on July 13, 2014.
- Kauffman, Stuart (October 2014). "Beyond the Stalemate: Conscious Mind-Body - Quantum Mechanics - Free Will - Possible Panpsychism - Possible Interpretation of Quantum Enigma". arXiv:1410.2127 [physics.hist-ph].
- Felin, T.; Kauffman, S.; Koppl, R.; Longo, G. (December 2014). "Economic Opportunity and Evolution: Beyond Landscapes and Bounded Rationality" (PDF). Strategic Entrepreneurship Journal. 8 (4): 269–282. doi:10.1002/sej.1184. SSRN 2197512.
- Vattay, G.; Salahub, D.; Csaibai, I.; Nassmi, A.; Kauffman, S. (February 2015). "Quantum Criticality at the Origin of Life". Journal of Physics: Conference Series. 626 (1) 012023. arXiv:1502.06880. Bibcode:2015JPhCS.626a2023V. doi:10.1088/1742-6596/626/1/012023. S2CID 18439451.
- Kauffman, S. (2016). "Answering Descartes: Beyond Turing". In Cooper, S. Barry; Hodges, Andrew (eds.). The Once and Future Turing. Cambridge University Press.

Books

- Kauffman, Stuart (1993). The Origins of Order: Self Organization and Selection in Evolution. Oxford University Press. ISBN 978-0-19-507951-7.
- Kauffman, Stuart (1995). At Home in the Universe: The Search for Laws of Self-Organization and Complexity. Oxford University Press. ISBN 978-0-19-511130-9.
- Kauffman, Stuart (2000). Investigations. Oxford University Press. ISBN 978-0-19-972894-7.
- Kauffman, Stuart (2008). Reinventing the Sacred: A New View of Science, Reason, and Religion. Basic Books. ISBN 978-0-465-00300-6.
- Kauffman, Stuart (2016). Humanity in a Creative Universe. Oxford University Press. ISBN 978-0-19-939045-8.
- Kauffman, Stuart (2019). A World Beyond Physics. Oxford University Press. ISBN 978-0-19-087133-8.
