= Tibor Gánti =

Hungarian theocratical biologist and biochemist

- Born: 10 September 1933; Vác, Hungary
- Died: 15 April 2009 (aged 75); Nagymaros, Hungary
- Education: Technical University of Budapest
- Known for: Chemoton model
- Scientific career
- Fields: Biochemistry
- Workplaces: University of Gödöllő; József Attila University; Eötvös Loránd University

Tibor Gánti (10 September 1933 – 15 April 2009) was a Hungarian theoretical biologist and biochemist, who is best known for his theory of the chemoton, a model for defining the minimal nature of life. He taught industrial biochemistry at Faculty of Science of the Eötvös University, and theoretical biology at University of Gödöllő, József Attila University, and Eötvös University.

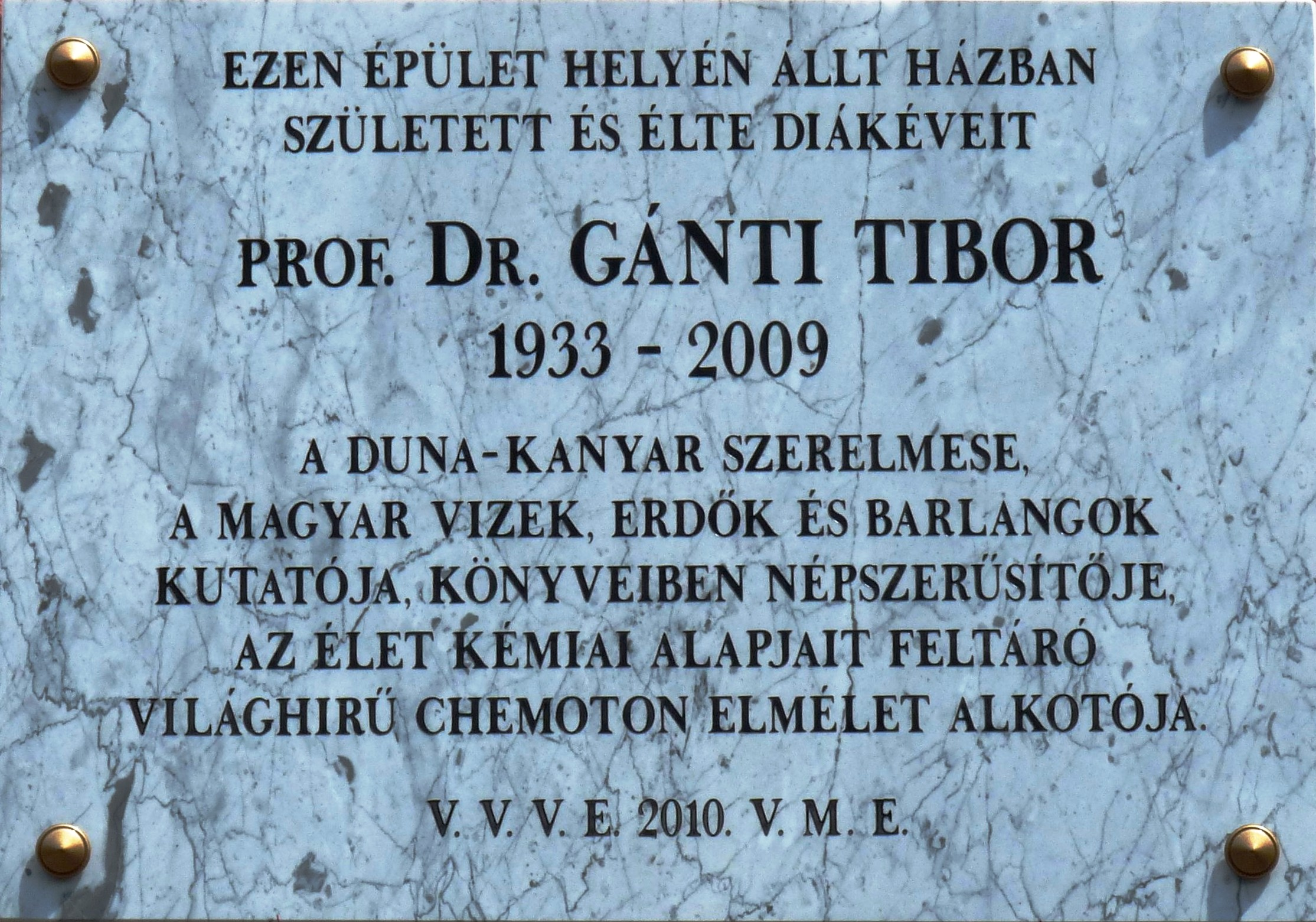
Plaque honoring Gánti at his birth site

== Biography ==
Tibor Gánti worked as laboratory assistant at the Bacteriological Laboratory, Factory of Canned Food at Dunakeszi from 1951 to 1952. He then moved to Photochemical Research Institute of Vác in 1953–1954. From 1958 to 1965 he was the head of Yeast Laboratory, Yeast Factory, Budapest. In the meantime he completed a diploma in chemical engineering from the Technical University of Budapest in 1958, and a Dr. techn. (PhD) in 1962. Between 1965 and 1974 he was the head of biochemical department at the Reanal Factory of Laboratory Chemicals in Budapest. He was awarded a doctorate in biological science by the Hungarian Academy of Sciences in 1980.

=== Academic career ===
Gánti joined Eötvös Loránd University as a guest lecturer of industrial biochemistry in 1968 and taught there until 1972. In 1974, he became a guest lecturer in theoretical biology at the University of Gödöllő. Between 1975 and 1979 he taught theoretical biology at József Attila University, Szeged. He became guest professor of theoretical biology at Eötvös University in 1978 up to 1999.

=== Chemoton ===
Gánti formulated a theory about the fundamental nature of living organisms, presented as a model called the chemoton in 1971. According to the chemoton model, of necessity, living organisms should have a basic autocatalytic subsystem consisting of metabolism and a replication process, and a membrane enclosing these functions.

His theory may be the most significant contribution to theoretical biology for understanding the chemical basis and origin of life, as it provides a philosophy of evolutionary units.

== Political career ==
Gánti founded the Alliance for the Protection of Nature and Society (TTVSZ) that received 0.03 percent of the votes and won no seats in the 1990 parliamentary election. He ran as a candidate on the national list of the National Democratic Alliance in the 1994 parliamentary election, but did not obtain a mandate.

== Awards ==
- 1982 Herman Otto prize
- 1986 MTESz prize
- 1989 Pro Natura medal

== Works ==
- Forradalom az élet kutatásában (1966), Gondolat, Budapest
- Az élet princípiuma (1971), Gondolat, Budapest
- A chemoton–elmélet alapjai (1974), Fizikai Szemle.
- A Theory of Biochemical Supersystems and Its Application to Problems of Natural and Artificial Biogenesis (1979), Akadémiai, Budapest–University Park Press, Baltimore, ISBN 978-0839114116
- Chemotonelmélet I. A fluid automaták elméleti alapjai (1984), OMIKK, Budapest
- The Principle of Life (1987), OMIKK, Budapest
- Chemotonelmélet II. Az élő rendszerek elmélete (1989), OMIKK, Budapest
- The Principles of Life (2003), Oxford University Press, ISBN 9780198507260
- Chemoton Theory. Vol. I. Theory of Fluid Machineries (2003), Kluwer Academic/Plenum Publishers, New York
- Chemoton Theory. Vol. II. Theory of Living Systems (2003), Kluwer Academic/Plenum Publishers, New York, ISBN 9780306477850
