= Addy Pross =

Israeli chemist

- Born: 1945 (age 80–81); Tel Aviv, Palestine (now Israel)
- Education: University of Sydney
- Known for: What Is Life? How Chemistry Becomes Biology
- Scientific career
- Fields: Chemistry, origin of life
- Workplaces: Stanford University, Lund University, Ben Gurion University, New York University Shanghai
- Doctoral advisor: Sever Sternhell

Addy Pross (born 1945) is an Israeli academic and author who is Emeritus Professor of chemistry at the Ben-Gurion University of the Negev. His research interests lie in Theoretical chemistry, the physics-chemistry-biology relationship and the origin of life.

Born in Tel Aviv in 1945, Pross attended University of Sydney, receiving his B.A. with First Class Hons. in 1966 and then a Ph.D in Organic chemistry in 1970 under Sever Sternhell. He worked as a visiting professor at Stanford University and Lund University before being appointed professor of chemistry at the Ben Gurion University in 1986. Pross has also served as a Visiting Professor in a number of universities including Rutgers University, University of Auckland and as an ARC Professorial Fellow at Sydney University.

In 2004 Pross co-authored with Vladimir Khodorkovsky a research paper called "Extending the concept of kinetic stability: toward a paradigm for life" which was published in the Journal of Physical Organic Chemistry. With regard to the Genes-first hypothesis he argued that though unlikely, the emergence of a replicating system that then develops metabolism is more likely than the emergence of a metabolic system that becomes replicative or a replicative metabolic system.

In 2010 Pross became a member of the editorial board at Life (journal). His 2012 book What Is Life? How Chemistry Becomes Biology was published by Oxford University Press and has been produced in nearly a dozen languages. Regarding a definition of life Pross has come to see both life and Abiogenesis as processes governed by the laws of chemistry.

In 2014 Pross started working as a visiting professor at New York University Shanghai. In 2023 the book Evolution "On Purpose": Teleonomy in Living Systems co-edited by Pross along with Peter Corning, Stuart Kauffman, Denis Noble, James A. Shapiro and Richard I. Vane-Wright stated in the introduction that "Teleonomy in living systems is not, after all, only "apparent". It is a fundamental fact of life." In 2024 Pross appeared on Sean M. Carroll's Mindscape podcast.

== Publications ==
=== Books ===
- Addy Pross (2026) Life's Chemical Secret: The Origin of Purpose and Mind MIT Press
- Addy Pross (2012) What is Life?: How Chemistry Becomes Biology Oxford University Press
- Addy Pross (1995) Theoretical and Physical Principles of Organic Reactivity Willey

=== Journal articles ===
- A Pross, R Pascal (2023) On the emergence of autonomous chemical systems through dissipation kinetics Life 13 (11), 2171
- R Pascal, A Pross (2023) Mind from Matter: The Chemical Connection Israel Journal of Chemistry 63 (7-8), e202300038
- R Pascal, A Pross (2022) On the chemical origin of biological cognition Life 12 (12), 2016
- A Pross, R Pascal (2022) Dynamic kinetic stability: Toward the physicalization of biology APS March Meeting Abstracts 2022, A14. 001
- A Pross (2021) How was Nature able to discover its own Laws — Twice? Life 11 (7), 679
- A Pross (2020) COVID‐19, Globalization, De‐globalization and the Slime Mold's Lessons for Us All Israel journal of chemistry 60 (8-9), 905-906
- A Pross (2019) Seeking to uncover Biology's Chemical Roots Emerging topics in life sciences 3 (5), 435-443
- R Pascal, A Pross (2019) Chemistry’s kinetic dimension and the physical basis for life Journal of Systems Chemistry 7 (1), 1–8
- A Pross (2018) Early life on Earth: Tracing the Chemical Path from Non-living to Living Proceedings of the International Astronomical Union 14 (S345), 206-214
- A Pross (2018) Purpose & Desire: What Makes Something “Alive” and Why Modern Darwinism Has Failed to Explain It The Quarterly Review of Biology 93 (1), 18-19
- A Pross, R Pascal (2017) How and why kinetics, thermodynamics, and chemistry induce the logic of biological evolution Beilstein journal of organic chemistry 13 (1), 665-674
- R Pascal, A Pross (2017) A roadmap toward synthetic protolife Synlett 28 (01), 30-35
- R Pascal, A Pross (2016) The logic of life Origins of Life and Evolution of Biospheres 46 (4), 507-513
- A Pross (2016) Physical organic chemistry and the origin of life problem: A personal perspective Israel Journal of Chemistry 56 (1), 83-88
- G Ashkenasy, A Pross (2015) Origin of Life: Special Issue Honoring Prof. Albert Eschenmoser on the Occasion of his 90th Birthday Israel Journal of Chemistry 55 (8), 835-836
- R Pascal, A Pross (2015) Stability and its manifestation in the chemical and biological worlds Chemical Communications 51 (90), 16160-16165
- R Pascal, A Pross (2014) The nature and mathematical basis for material stability in the chemical and biological worlds Journal of Systems Chemistry 5 (1), 3
- R Pascal, A Pross, JD Sutherland (2013) Towards an evolutionary theory of the origin of life based on kinetics and thermodynamics Open Biology 3 (11), 130156
- A Pross (2013) Dynamic kinetic stability (DKS) as a conceptual bridge linking chemistry to biology Current Organic Chemistry 17 (16), 1702-1703
- A Pross (2013) The evolutionary origin of biological function and complexity Journal of molecular evolution 76 (4), 185-191
- A Pross, R Pascal (2013) The origin of life: what we know, what we can know and what we will never know Open biology 3 (3), 120190
- A Pross (2012) How does biology emerge from chemistry? Origins of Life and Evolution of Biospheres 42 (5), 433-444
- R Armon, U Charpa, E Davidson, U Deichmann, R Falk, J Glass, S Glick, M Laubichler, M Morange, I Nevo, A Pross, S Roth, V Shoshan-Barmatz (2012) Final Discussion: Issues and Challenges for the Future Perspectives in Biology and Medicine 55 (4), 608-611
- A Pross (2011) Toward a general theory of evolution: Extending Darwinian theory to inanimate matter Journal of Systems Chemistry 2 (1), 1
- N Wagner, A Pross (2011) The nature of stability in replicating systems Entropy 13 (2), 518-527
- A Pross (2010) Commentary on "life as a unity or confederacy" Origins of Life and Evolution of the Biosphere 40, 478-480
- A Pross (2010) Commentary on "plausibility of an RNA World" Origins of Life and Evolution of the Biosphere 40, 434-437
- N Wagner, A Pross, E Tannenbaum (2010) Selection advantage of metabolic over non-metabolic replicators: a kinetic analysis Biosystems 99 (2), 126-129
- A Pross (2009) Seeking the chemical roots of Darwinism: bridging between chemistry and biology Chemistry: A European Journal 15 (34), 8374-8381
- A Pross (2008) How can a chemical system act purposefully? Bridging between life and non‐life Journal of Physical Organic Chemistry 21 (7‐8), 724-730
- A Pross (2008) How can a chemical system act purposefully Bridging between life and non-life. J
- A Pross (2005) On the chemical nature and origin of teleonomy Origins of Life and Evolution of Biospheres 35 (4), 383-394
- A Pross (2005) On the emergence of biological complexity: life as a kinetic state of matter Origins of Life and Evolution of Biospheres 35 (2), 151-166
- A Pross (2005)Stability in chemistry and biology: Life as a kinetic state of matter Pure and Applied Chemistry 77 (11), 1905-1921
- A Pross (2004) Causation and the origin of life. Metabolism or replication first? Origins of Life and Evolution of the Biosphere 34 (3), 307-321
- A Pross, V Khodorkovsky (2004) Extending the concept of kinetic stability: toward a paradigm for life Journal of physical organic chemistry 17 (4), 312-316
- ML Coote, A Pross, L Radom (2004) Understanding Alkyl Substituent Effects in RO Bond Dissociation Reactions in Open-and Closed-Shell Systems Fundamental World of Quantum Chemistry: A Tribute to the Memory of Per-Olov …
- ML Coote, A Pross, L Radom (2003) Variable Trends in R−X Bond Dissociation Energies (R = Me, Et, i-Pr, t-Bu) Organic Letters 5 (24), 4689-4692
- A Pross (2003) The driving force for life's emergence: kinetic and thermodynamic considerations Journal of theoretical Biology 220 (3), 393-406
- TI Sølling, A Pross, L Radom (2001) A high-level ab initio investigation of identity and nonidentity gas-phase SN2 reactions of halide ions with halophosphines International Journal of Mass Spectrometry 210, 1-11
- L Radom, MW Wong, A Pross (1998) Radical Addition to Alkenes: A Theoretical Perspective
- L Radom, MW Wong, A Pross (1997) Theoretical aspects of radical reactions American Chemical Society, Polymer Preprints, Division of Polymer Chemistry …
- L Radom, MW Wong, A Pross, JPA Heuts, RG Gilbert (1997) Theoretical aspects of free radical reactions Abstracts of Papers of the American Chemical Society 213, 260-260
- MN Glukhovtsev, A Pross, HB Schlegel, RD Bach, L Radom (1996) Gas-Phase Identity SN2 Reactions of Halide Anions and Methyl Halides with Retention of Configuration Journal of the American Chemical Society 118 (45), 11258-11264
- MN Glukhovtsev, S Laiter, A Pross (1996 )Thermochemical assessment of the aromatic and antiaromatic characters of the cyclopropenyl cation, cyclopropenyl anion, and cyclopropenyl radical: A high-level computational study The Journal of Physical Chemistry 100 (45), 17801-17806
- JPA Heuts, A Pross, L Radom (1996) Hydrogen transfer between ethyl radical and ethylene: An example where kinetics does not follow thermodynamics The Journal of Physical Chemistry 100 (43), 17087-17089
- MN Glukhovtsev, RD Bach, A Pross, L Radom (1996) The performance of B3-LYP density functional theory in describing SN2 reactions at saturated carbon Chemical physics letters 260 (5-6), 558-564
- MN Glukhovtsev, A Pross, L Radom (1996) Gas-Phase Non-Identity SN2 Reactions of Halide Anions with Methyl Halides: A High-Level Computational Study Journal of the American Chemical Society 118 (26), 6273-6284
- MN Glukhovtsev, A Pross, MP McGrath, L Radom (1996) Erratum: Extension of Gaussian-2 (G2) theory to bromine-and iodine-containing molecules: Use of effective core potentials The Journal of Chemical Physics 104 (9), 3407
- MN Glukhovtsev, A Pross, L Radom (1996) Acidities, proton affinities, and other thermochemical properties of hypohalous acids HOX (X= F− I): A high-level computational study The Journal of Physical Chemistry 100 (9), 3498-3503
- A Pross, H Zipse (1996) Theoretical and Physical Principles of Organic Reactivity Angewandte Chemie-English Edition 35 (16), 1866-1866
- A Pross (1995) Theoretical and physical principles of organic reactivity (No Title)
- MN Glukhovtsev, A Pross, L Radom (1995) Gas-phase identity SN2 reactions of halide ions at neutral nitrogen: A high-level computational study Journal of the American Chemical Society 117 (35), 9012-9018
- MN Glukhovtsev, A Pross, MP McGrath, L Radom (1995) Extension of Gaussian‐2 (G2) theory to bromine‐and iodine‐containing molecules: Use of effective core potentials The Journal of chemical physics 103 (5), 1878-1885
- MN Glukhovtsev, S Laiter, A Pross (1995) Thermochemistry of cyclobutadiene and tetrahedrane: A high-level computational study The Journal of Physical Chemistry 99 (18), 6828-6831
- MN Glukhovtsev, A Pross, L Radom (1995) Gas-phase identity SN2 reactions of halide anions with methyl halides: a high-level computational study Journal of the American Chemical Society 117 (7), 2024-2032
- MN Glukhovtsev, A Pross, A Nicolaides, L Radom (1995) Is the most stable gas-phase isomer of the benzenium cation a face-protonated π-complex? Journal of the Chemical Society, Chemical Communications, 2347-2348
- MN Glukhovtsev, JE Szulejko, TB McMahon, JW Gauld, AP Scott, B J Smith, A Pross, L Radom (1994) New theoretical and experimental proton affinities for methyl halides and diazomethane: A revision of the methyl cation affinity scale The Journal of Physical Chemistry 98 (50), 13099-13101
- MW Wong, A Pross, L Radom (1994) Addition of tert-butyl radical to substituted alkenes: a theoretical study of the reaction mechanism Journal of the American Chemical Society 116 (26), 11938-11943
- MW Wong, A Pross, L Radom (1994) Comparison of the addition of CH3. bul., CH2OH. bul., and CH2CN. bul. Radicals to substituted alkenes: A theoretical study of the reaction mechanism Journal of the American Chemical Society 116 (14), 6284-6292
- MN Glukhovtsev, A Pross, L Radom (1994) Is SN2 substitution with inversion of configuration at vinylic carbon feasible? Journal of the American Chemical Society 116 (13), 5961-5962
- MW Wong, A Pross, L Radom (1994) The Mechanism of Radical-Addition to Alkenes Abstracts of Papers of The American Chemical Society 207, 242-ORGN
- A Pross, SS Shaik, HB Schlegel, S Wolfe (1994) Theoretical Aspects of Physical Organic Chemistry. The SN2 Mechanism Journal of the American Chemical Society 116 (18), 8434-8434
- S Shaik, A Ioffe, AC Reddy, A Pross (1994) Is the avoided crossing state a good approximation for the transition state of a chemical reaction? An analysis of Menschutkin and ionic SN2 reactions Journal of the American Chemical Society 116 (1), 262-273
- MW Wong, A Pross, L Radom (1993) Are polar interactions important in the addition of methyl radical to alkenes? Journal of the American Chemical Society 115 (23), 11050-11051
- MW Wong, A Pross, L Radom (1993) Addition of methyl radical to substituted alkenes: a theoretical study of the reaction mechanism Israel journal of chemistry 33 (4), 415-425
- A Pross, S Shaik (1992) What is a Good Approximation for the Transition State of an SN2 Reaction? Croatica Chemica Acta 65 (3), 625-631
- A Pross, H Yamataka, S Nagase (1991) Reactivity in radical abstraction reactions: Application of the curve crossing model Journal of physical organic chemistry 4 (3), 135-140
- A Pross, RA Moss (1990) A curve crossing approach to carbenic reactivity Tetrahedron letters 31 (32), 4553-4556
- SS Shaik, A Pross (1989) Nucleophilic attack on cation radicals and cations. A theoretical analysis Journal of the American Chemical Society 111 (12), 4306-4312
- A Pross, SS Shaik (1987) Brønsted coefficients. Do they measure transition state structure? New Journal of Chemistry 13 (6), 427-433
- AJ Shusterman, I Tamir, A Pross (1988) The mechanism of organometallic migration reactions. A configuration mixing (CM) approach Journal of Organometallic Chemistry 340 (2), 203-222
- A Pross (1987) Relationship between Nucleophilic Reactions and Single-Electron Transfer: Application to Reactions of Radical Cations Nucleophilicity Chapter 23, 331-338
- A Pross, DM Chipman (1987) The single-electron shift as a basis of organic reactivity Free Radical Biology and Medicine 3 (1), 55-64
- A Pross (1986) Can nucleophiles attack radical cations directly? "Allowed" and "forbidden" polar reactions. Journal of the American Chemical Society 108 (12), 3537-3538
- A Pross (1985) The single electron shift as a fundamental process in organic chemistry: the relationship between polar and electron-transfer pathways. Accounts of Chemical Research 18 (7), 212-219
- A Pross (1985) Factors Governing the Competition Between Nucleophilic and Single-electron Transfer Processes. Abstracts of Papers of The American Chemical Society 190 (SEP), 92-ORN
- A Pross (1985), Limitations of the Reactivity—Selectivity Principle. Application to Free Radical Addition to Alkenes and Nucleophilic Aliphatic Substitution. Israel Journal of Chemistry 26 (4) 390-394
