= Government by algorithm =

Alternative form of government or social ordering

Government by algorithm encompasses a range of approaches involving the application of computer algorithms to aspects of society and governance. This term, also referred to as algorithmic regulation, regulation by algorithms, algorithmic governance, algocratic governance, algorithmic legal order, or algocracy, describes the use of algorithms to influence or govern sectors such as law enforcement, transportation, and land registration. The term "government by algorithm" was first introduced in academic literature in 2013 as an alternative for "algorithmic governance". A related term, algorithmic regulation, involves the use of computational algorithms to set standards, monitor, and modify behavior within specific contexts, such as the automation of the judiciary.

Government by algorithm raises challenges that are not fully addressed in the existing e-government literature or public administration practice. Some sources equate cyberocracy, which is a hypothetical form of government that rules by the effective use of information, with algorithmic governance, although algorithms are not the only means of processing information. Nello Cristianini and Teresa Scantamburlo argued that the combination of a human society and certain regulation algorithms (such as reputation-based scoring) forms a social machine.

== History ==
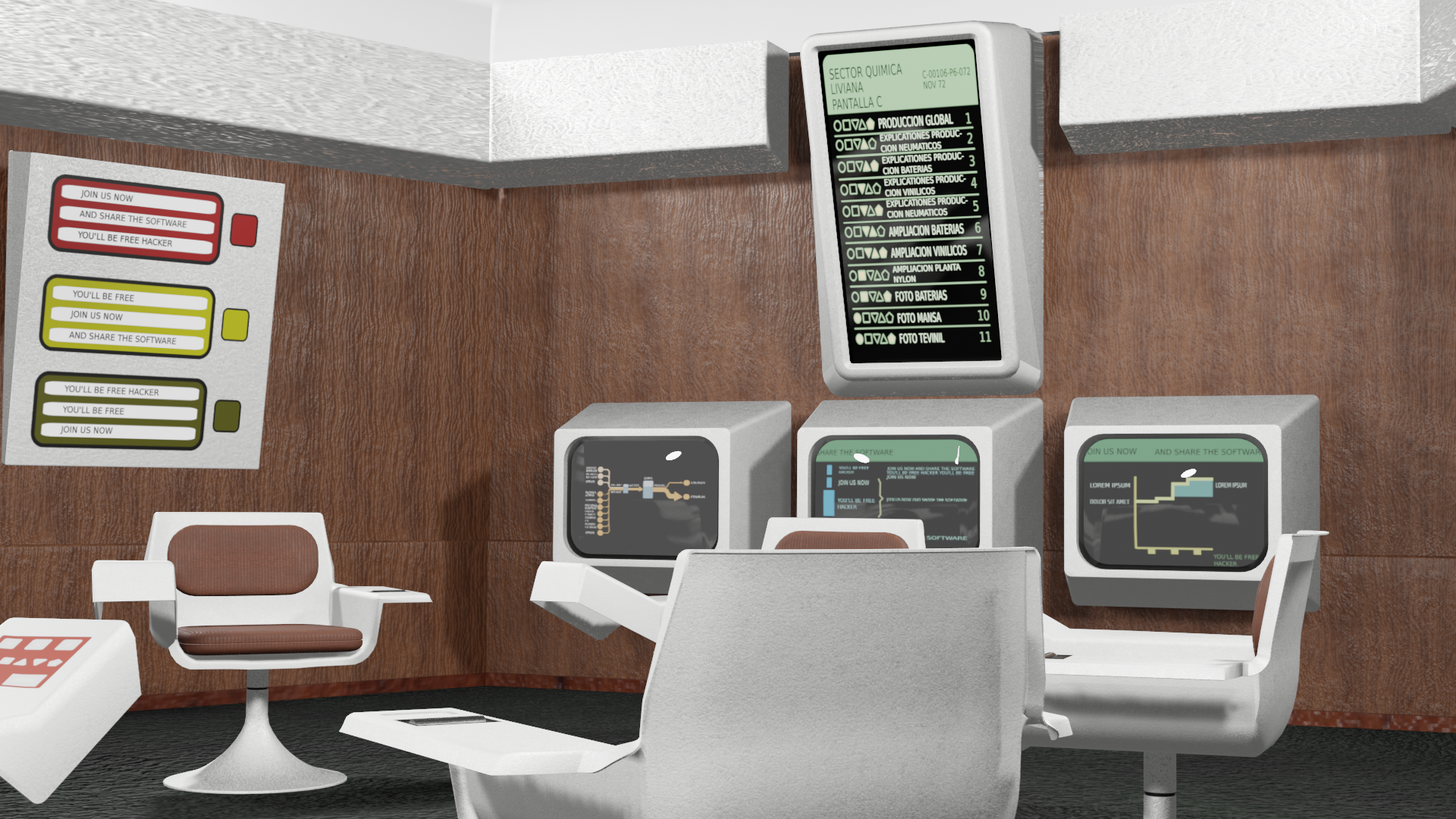
Computer-generated image of Project Cybersyn operations room

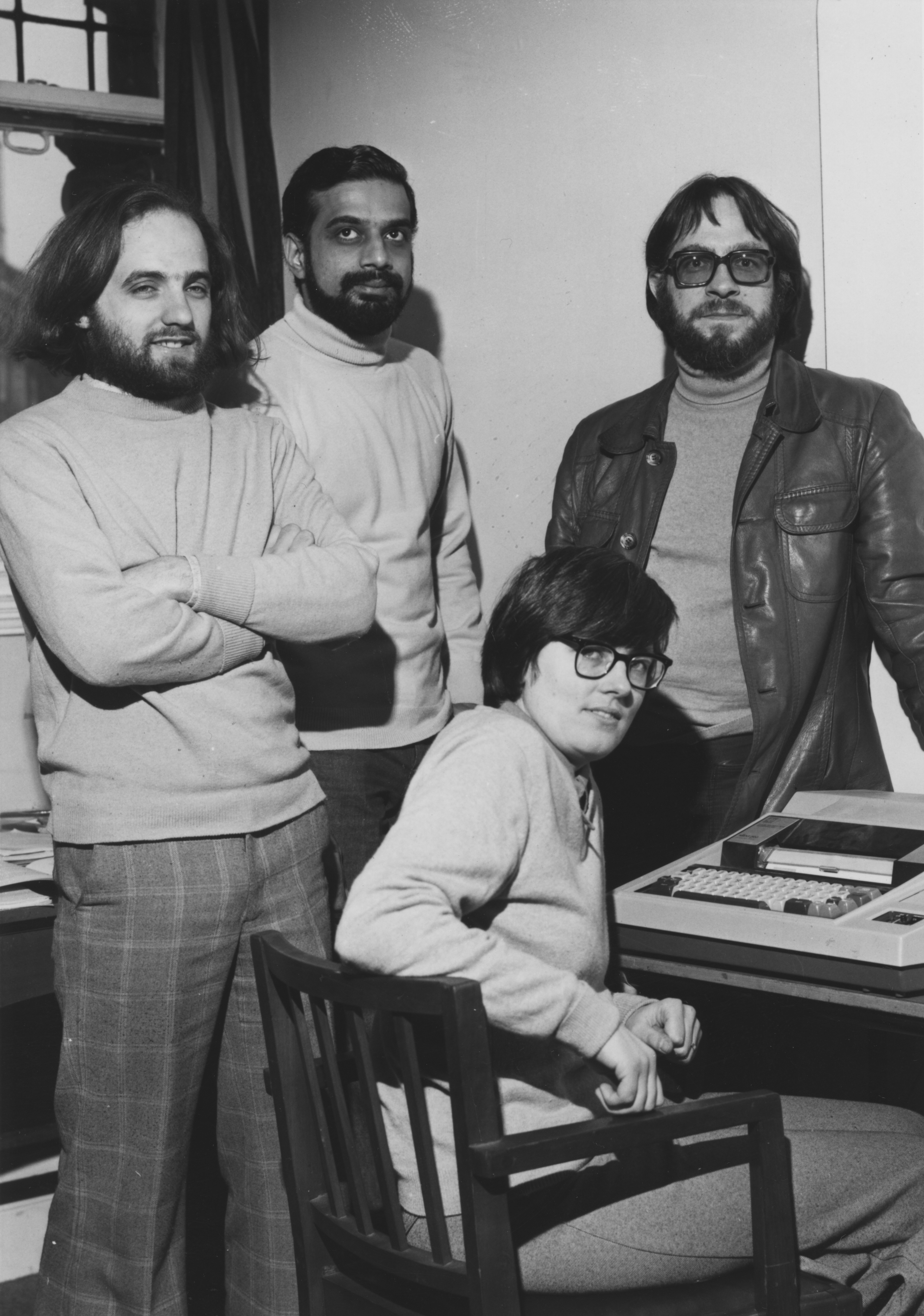
LEGOL Group (1977)

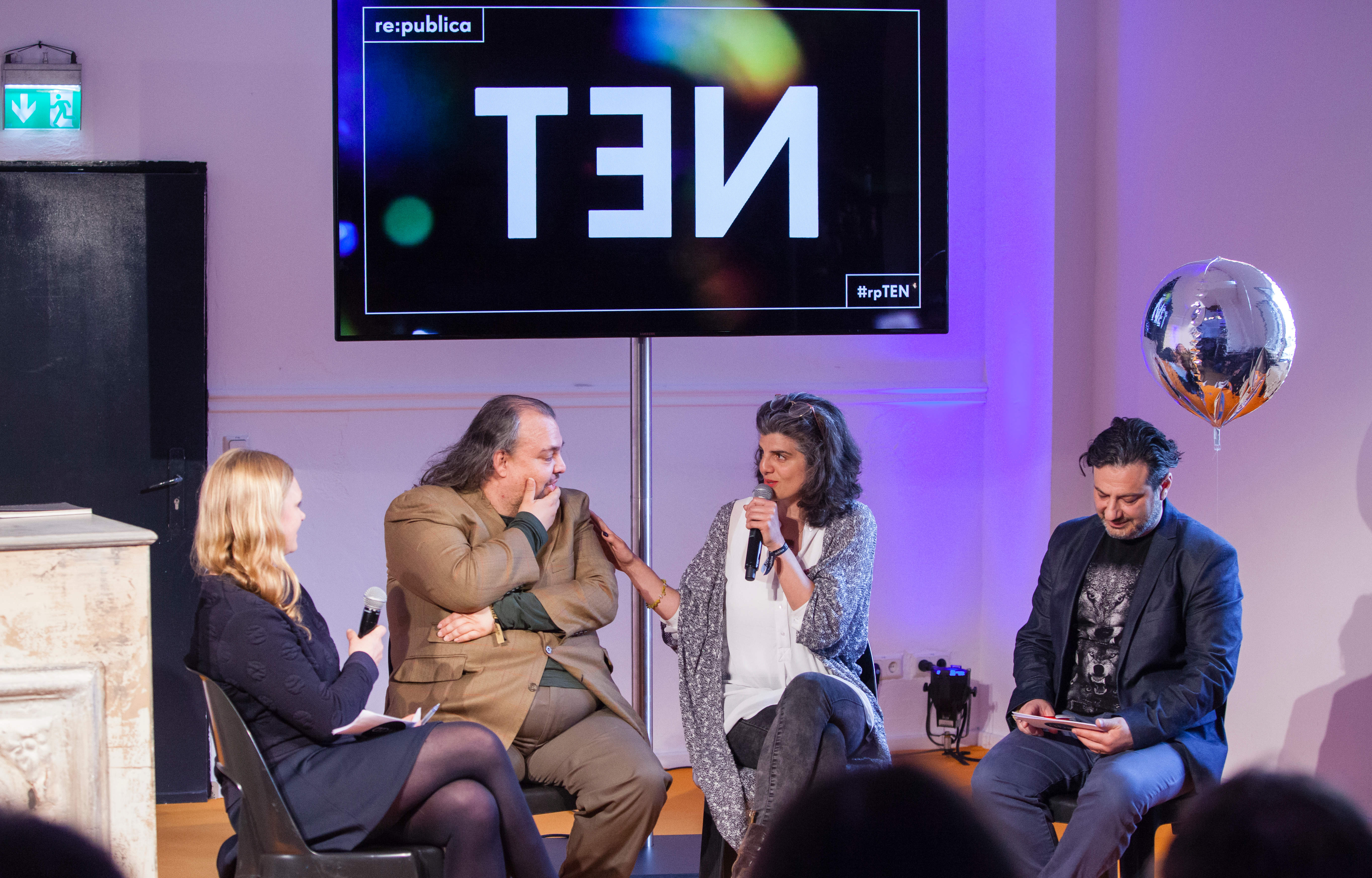
"Blockchain and the future of governance. Let's overcome the hype and understand what can be done." with Andrea Bauer, Boris Moshkovits und Shermin Voshmgir at re:publica

In 1962, the director of the Institute for Information Transmission Problems of the Russian Academy of Sciences in Moscow (later Kharkevich Institute), Alexander Kharkevich, published an article in the journal "Communist" about a computer network for processing information and control of the economy. He proposed a computer network resembling aspects of the modern Internet for the purposes of algorithmic governance (Project OGAS). This proposal raised concerns among CIA analysts. In particular, Arthur M. Schlesinger Jr. warned that "by 1970 the USSR may have a radically new production technology, involving total enterprises or complexes of industries, managed by closed-loop, feedback control employing self-teaching computers".

Between 1971 and 1973, the Chilean government carried out Project Cybersyn during the presidency of Salvador Allende. This project was aimed at constructing a distributed decision support system to improve the management of the national economy. Elements of the project were used in 1972 to successfully overcome the traffic collapse caused by a CIA-sponsored strike of forty thousand truck drivers. Besides that initial project, its architect, Stafford Beer was involved in similar cybernetic projects across Latin America during the 1980s and 1990s, as the region gradually returned to democracy, particularly in Uruguay and Colombia, in which his Viable System Model's (VSM) was applied.

Also in the 1960s and 1970s, Herbert A. Simon championed expert systems as tools for rationalization and evaluation of administrative behavior. The automation of rule-based processes was an ambition of tax agencies over many decades resulting in varying success. Early work from this period includes Thorne McCarty's influential TAXMAN project in the US and Ronald Stamper's LEGOL project in the UK. In 1993, the computer scientist Paul Cockshott from the University of Glasgow and the economist Allin Cottrell from the Wake Forest University published the book Towards a New Socialism, where they claim to demonstrate the possibility of a democratically planned economy built on modern computer technology. The Honourable Justice Michael Kirby published a paper in 1998, where he expressed optimism that the then-available computer technologies such as legal expert system could evolve to computer systems, which will strongly affect the practice of courts. In 2006, attorney Lawrence Lessig, known for the slogan "Code is law", wrote:

[T]he invisible hand of cyberspace is building an architecture that is quite the opposite of its architecture at its birth. This invisible hand, pushed by government and by commerce, is constructing an architecture that will perfect control and make highly efficient regulation possible

Since the 2000s, algorithms have been designed and used to automatically analyze surveillance videos.

In his 2006 book Virtual Migration, A. Aneesh developed the concept of algocracy — information technologies constrain human participation in public decision making. Aneesh differentiated algocratic systems from bureaucratic systems (legal-rational regulation) as well as market-based systems (price-based regulation).

In 2013, the concept of algorithmic regulation was popularized by Tim O’Reilly, founder and CEO of O’Reilly Media:

Sometimes the "rules" aren't really even rules. Gordon Bruce, the former CIO of the city of Honolulu, explained to me that when he entered government from the private sector and tried to make changes, he was told, "That's against the law." His reply was "OK. Show me the law." "Well, it isn't really a law. It's a regulation." "OK. Show me the regulation." "Well, it isn't really a regulation. It's a policy that was put in place by Mr. Somebody twenty years ago." "Great. We can change that!" [...] Laws should specify goals, rights, outcomes, authorities, and limits. If specified broadly, those laws can stand the test of time. Regulations, which specify how to execute those laws in much more detail, should be regarded in much the same way that programmers regard their code and algorithms, that is, as a constantly updated toolset to achieve the outcomes specified in the laws. [...] It's time for government to enter the age of big data. Algorithmic regulation is an idea whose time has come.

In 2017, Ukraine's Ministry of Justice ran experimental government auctions using blockchain technology to ensure transparency and hinder corruption in governmental transactions. "Government by Algorithm?" was the central theme introduced at Data for Policy 2017 conference held on 6–7 September 2017 in London.

== Examples ==
=== Smart cities ===
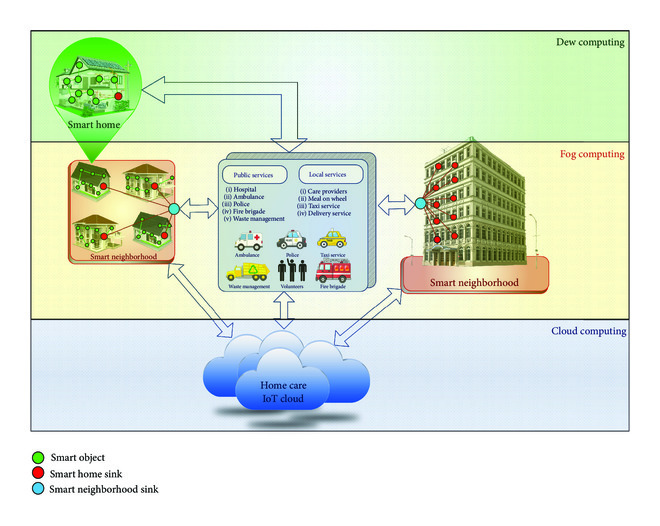
Architecture of the IoT for home care systems

A smart city is an urban area where collected surveillance data is used to improve various operations. Increases in computational power allow more automated decision-making and replacement of public agencies by algorithmic governance. In particular, the combined use of artificial intelligence and blockchains for IoT may lead to the creation of sustainable smart city ecosystems. Intelligent street lighting in Glasgow is an example of successful government application of AI algorithms. A study of smart city initiatives in the US shows that it requires public sector as a main organizer and coordinator, the private sector as a technology and infrastructure provider, and universities as expertise contributors.

The cryptocurrency millionaire Jeffrey Berns proposed the operation of local governments in Nevada by tech firms in 2021. Berns bought 67,000 acres (271 km^{2}) in Nevada's rural Storey County (population 4,104) for $170,000,000 (£121,000,000) in 2018 in order to develop a smart city with more than 36,000 residents that could generate an annual output of $4,600,000,000. Cryptocurrency would be allowed for payments. Blockchains, Inc. "Innovation Zone" was canceled in September 2021 after it failed to secure enough water for the planned 36,000 residents, through water imports from a site located 100 miles away in the neighboring Washoe County. A similar water pipeline proposed in 2007 was estimated to cost $100 million and would have taken about 10 years to develop. With additional water rights purchased from Tahoe Reno Industrial General Improvement District, "Innovation Zone" would have acquired enough water for about 15,400 homes – meaning that it would have barely covered its planned 15,000 dwelling units, leaving nothing for the rest of the projected city and its 22 million square-feet of industrial development.

In Saudi Arabia, the planners of The Line assert that it will be monitored by AI to improve life by using data and predictive modeling.

=== Reputation systems ===
Model of cybernetic thinking about organisation. On the one hand in reality a system is determined. On the other hand, cybernetic factory can be modeled as a control system.

Tim O'Reilly suggested that data sources and reputation systems combined in algorithmic regulation can outperform traditional regulations. For instance, once taxi-drivers are rated by passengers, the quality of their services will improve automatically and "drivers who provide poor service are eliminated". O'Reilly's suggestion is based on the control-theoretic concept of feed-back loop—improvements and disimprovements of reputation enforce desired behavior. The usage of feedback-loops for the management of social systems has already been suggested in management cybernetics by Stafford Beer before.

These connections are explored by Nello Cristianini and Teresa Scantamburlo, where the reputation-credit scoring system is modeled as an incentive given to the citizens and computed by a social machine, so that rational agents would be motivated to increase their score by adapting their behaviour. Several ethical aspects of that technology are still being discussed.

China's Social Credit System was said to be a mass surveillance effort with a centralized numerical score for each citizen given for their actions, though newer reports say that this is a widespread misconception.

=== Smart contracts ===
Smart contracts, cryptocurrencies, and decentralized autonomous organization are mentioned as means to replace traditional ways of governance. Cryptocurrencies are currencies which are enabled by algorithms without a governmental central bank. Central bank digital currency often employs similar technology, but is differentiated from the fact that it does use a central bank. It is being explored or implemented by governments and institutions, including the European Union and China. Smart contracts are self-executable contracts, whose objectives are the reduction of need in trusted governmental intermediators, arbitrations and enforcement costs. A decentralized autonomous organization is an organization represented by smart contracts that is transparent, controlled by shareholders and not influenced by a central government. Smart contracts have been discussed for use in such applications as use in (temporary) employment contracts and automatic transfership of funds and property (i.e. inheritance, upon registration of a death certificate). Some countries such as Georgia and Sweden have already launched blockchain programs focusing on property (land titles and real estate ownership) Ukraine is also looking at other areas too such as state registers.

=== Algorithms in government agencies ===
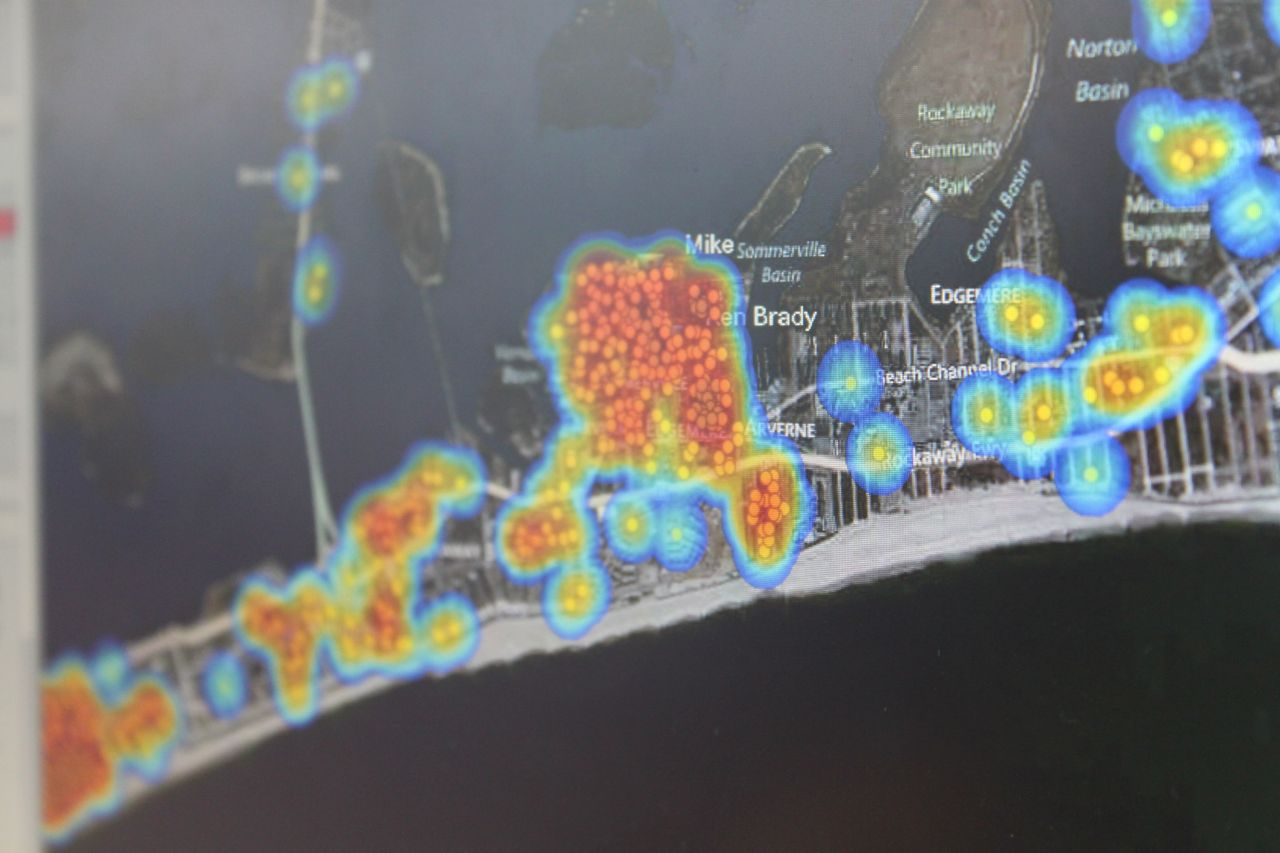
Team Rubicon in the Rockaways Nov 12, 2012 – Palantir screenshot

According to a study of Stanford University, 45% of the studied US federal agencies have experimented with AI and related machine learning (ML) tools up to 2020. US federal agencies counted the number of artificial intelligence applications, which are listed below. 53% of these applications were produced by in-house experts. Commercial providers of residual applications include Palantir Technologies.

| Agency name | Number of use cases |
|---|---|
| Office of Justice Programs | 12 |
| Securities and Exchange Commission | 10 |
| National Aeronautics and Space Administration | 9 |
| Food and Drug Administration | 8 |
| United States Geological Survey | 8 |
| United States Postal Service | 8 |
| Social Security Administration | 7 |
| United States Patent and Trademark Office | 6 |
| Bureau of Labor Statistics | 5 |
| U.S. Customs and Border Protection | 4 |

In 2012, NOPD started a collaboration with Palantir Technologies in the field of predictive policing. Besides Palantir's Gotham software, other similar (numerical analysis software) used by police agencies (such as the NCRIC) include SAS.

In the fight against money laundering, FinCEN employs the FinCEN Artificial Intelligence System (FAIS) since 1995.

National health administration entities and organisations such as AHIMA (American Health Information Management Association) hold medical records. Medical records serve as the central repository for planning patient care and documenting communication among patient and health care provider and professionals contributing to the patient's care. In the EU, work is ongoing on a European Health Data Space which supports the use of health data.

US Department of Homeland Security has employed the software ATLAS, which run on Amazon Cloud. It scanned more than 16.5 million records of naturalized Americans and flagged approximately 124,000 of them for manual analysis and review by USCIS officers regarding denaturalization. They were flagged due to potential fraud, public safety and national security issues. Some of the scanned data came from Terrorist Screening Database and National Crime Information Center.

The NarxCare is a US software, which combines data from the prescription registries of various U.S. states and uses machine learning to generate various three-digit "risk scores" for prescriptions of medications and an overall "Overdose Risk Score", collectively referred to as Narx Scores, in a process that potentially includes EMS and criminal justice data as well as court records.

In Estonia, artificial intelligence is used in its e-government to make it more automated and seamless. A virtual assistant will guide citizens through any interactions they have with the government. Automated and proactive services "push" services to citizens at key events of their lives (including births, bereavements, unemployment). One example is the automated registering of babies when they are born. Estonia's X-Road system will also be rebuilt to include even more privacy control and accountability into the way the government uses citizen's data.

In Costa Rica, the possible digitalization of public procurement activities (i.e. tenders for public works) has been investigated. The paper discussing this possibility mentions that the use of ICT in procurement has several benefits such as increasing transparency, facilitating digital access to public tenders, reducing direct interaction between procurement officials and companies at moments of high integrity risk, increasing outreach and competition, and easier detection of irregularities.

Besides using e-tenders for regular public works (construction of buildings, roads), e-tenders can also be used for reforestation projects and other carbon sink restoration projects. Carbon sink restoration projects may be part of the nationally determined contributions plans in order to reach the national Paris agreement goals.

Government procurement audit software can also be used. Audits are performed in some countries after subsidies have been received.

Some government agencies provide track and trace systems for services they offer. An example is track and trace for applications done by citizens (i.e. driving license procurement).

Some government services use issue tracking systems to keep track of ongoing issues.

=== Justice by algorithm ===
Judges' decisions in Australia are supported by the "Split Up" software in cases of determining the percentage of a split after a divorce. COMPAS software is used in the US to assess the risk of recidivism in courts. According to the statement of Beijing Internet Court, China is the first country to create an internet court or cyber court. The Chinese AI judge is a virtual recreation of an actual female judge. She "will help the court's judges complete repetitive basic work, including litigation reception, thus enabling professional practitioners to focus better on their trial work". Also, Estonia plans to employ artificial intelligence to decide small-claim cases of less than €7,000.

Lawbots can perform tasks that are typically done by paralegals or young associates at law firms. One such technology used by US law firms to assist in legal research is from ROSS Intelligence, and others vary in sophistication and dependence on scripted algorithms. Another legal technology chatbot application is DoNotPay.

=== Algorithms in education ===
Due to the COVID-19 pandemic in 2020, in-person final exams were impossible for thousands of students. The public high school Westminster High employed algorithms to assign grades. UK's Department for Education also employed a statistical calculus to assign final grades in A-levels, due to the pandemic.

Besides use in grading, software systems like AI were used in preparation for college entrance exams.

AI teaching assistants are being developed and used for education (e.g. Georgia Tech's Jill Watson) and there is also an ongoing debate on the possibility of teachers being entirely replaced by AI systems (e.g. in homeschooling).

=== AI politicians ===
In 2018, an activist named Michihito Matsuda ran for mayor in the Tama city area of Tokyo as a human proxy for an artificial intelligence program. While election posters and campaign material used the term robot, and displayed stock images of a feminine android, the "AI mayor" was in fact a machine learning algorithm trained using Tama city datasets. The project was backed by high-profile executives Tetsuzo Matsumoto of Softbank and Norio Murakami of Google. Michihito Matsuda came third in the election, being defeated by Hiroyuki Abe. Organisers claimed that the 'AI mayor' was programmed to analyze citizen petitions put forward to the city council in a more 'fair and balanced' way than human politicians.

In 2018, Cesar Hidalgo presented the idea of augumented democracy. In an augumented democracy, legislation is done by digital twins of every single person.

In 2019, AI-powered messenger chatbot SAM participated in the discussions on social media connected to an electoral race in New Zealand. The creator of SAM, Nick Gerritsen, believed SAM would be advanced enough to run as a candidate by late 2020, when New Zealand had its next general election.

In 2022, the chatbot "Leader Lars" or "Leder Lars" was nominated for The Synthetic Party to run in the 2022 Danish parliamentary election, and was built by the artist collective Computer Lars. Leader Lars differed from earlier virtual politicians by leading a political party and by not pretending to be an objective candidate. This chatbot engaged in critical discussions on politics with users from around the world.

In November 2023, in the Japanese town of Manazuru, a mayoral candidate called "AI Mayer" hoped to be the first AI-powered officeholder in Japan. This candidacy was said to be supported by a group led by Michihito Matsuda.

In the 2024 United Kingdom general election, a businessman named Steve Endacott ran for the constituency of Brighton Pavilion as an AI avatar named "AI Steve", saying that constituents could interact with AI Steve to shape policy. Endacott stated that he would only attend Parliament to vote based on policies which had garnered at least 50% support. AI Steve placed last with 179 votes.

On September 11, 2025, Albania's Prime Minister Edi Rama appointed AI chatbot Diella to the seat of Minister for Public Procurements. The move, he claimed, would make Albania "a country where 100% of public tenders are free of corruption". He stated that the process would be "step-by-step", and that "Albania's public tenders will be "100 percent incorruptible and where every public fund that goes through the tender procedure is 100 percent legible." Leaving it up to interpretation whether he was talking about her appointment, or the process of automating public procurements using Diella. Public opinion is torn on the topic of whether Albania should use Diella for this purpose. Many Eastern-Europeans are claiming the move is a step in the right direction, and that Albania is advancing. Many Westerners, however, have approached the move with a more critical lens, saying it is a dangerous and reckless move to place billions in public funding in the hands of an AI.

=== Management of infection ===
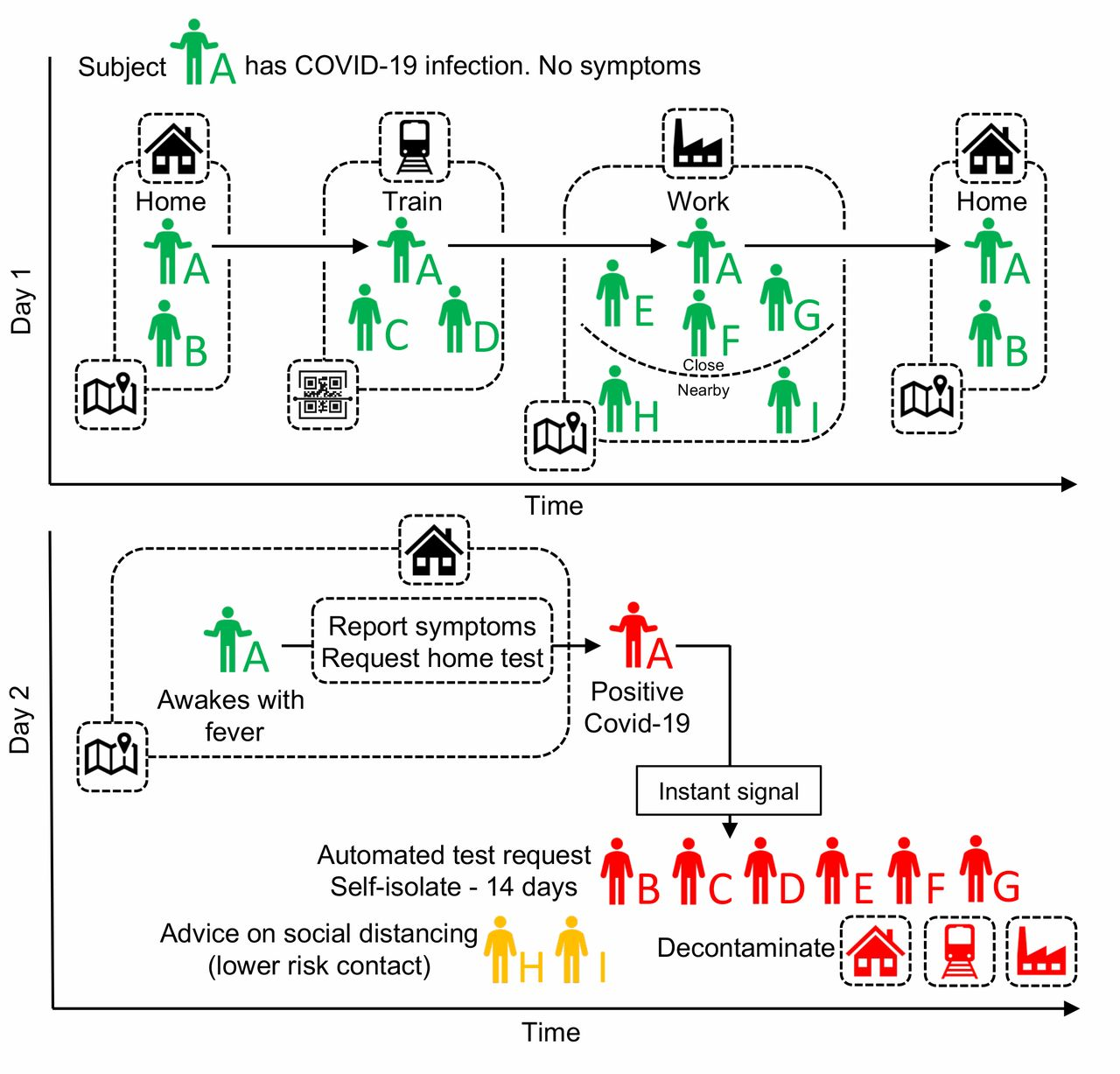
A schematic of app-based COVID-19 contact tracing

In February 2020, China launched a mobile app to deal with the Coronavirus outbreak called "close-contact-detector". Users are asked to enter their name and ID number. The app is able to detect "close contact" using surveillance data (i.e. using public transport records, including trains and flights) and therefore a potential risk of infection. Every user can also check the status of three other users. To make this inquiry users scan a Quick Response (QR) code on their smartphones using apps like Alipay or WeChat. The close contact detector can be accessed via popular mobile apps including Alipay. If a potential risk is detected, the app not only recommends self-quarantine, it also alerts local health officials.

Alipay also has the Alipay Health Code which is used to keep citizens safe. This system generates a QR code in one of three colors (green, yellow, or red) after users fill in a form on Alipay with personal details. A green code enables the holder to move around unrestricted. A yellow code requires the user to stay at home for seven days and red means a two-week quarantine. In some cities such as Hangzhou, it has become nearly impossible to get around without showing one's Alipay code.

In Cannes, France, monitoring software has been used on footage shot by CCTV cameras, allowing to monitor their compliance to local social distancing and mask wearing during the COVID-19 pandemic. The system does not store identifying data, but rather allows to alert city authorities and police where breaches of the mask and mask wearing rules are spotted (allowing fining to be carried out where needed). The algorithms used by the monitoring software can be incorporated into existing surveillance systems in public spaces (hospitals, stations, airports, shopping centres, ...)

Cellphone data is used to locate infected patients in South Korea, Taiwan, Singapore and other countries. In March 2020, the Israeli government enabled security agencies to track mobile phone data of people supposed to have coronavirus. The measure was taken to enforce quarantine and protect those who may come into contact with infected citizens. Also in March 2020, Deutsche Telekom shared private cellphone data with the federal government agency, Robert Koch Institute, in order to research and prevent the spread of the virus. Russia deployed facial recognition technology to detect quarantine breakers. Italian regional health commissioner Giulio Gallera said that "40% of people are continuing to move around anyway", as he has been informed by mobile phone operators. In USA, Europe and UK, Palantir Technologies is taken in charge to provide COVID-19 tracking services.

=== Prevention and management of environmental disasters ===
Tsunamis can be detected by tsunami warning systems. They can make use of AI. Floodings can also be detected using AI systems. Wildfires can be predicted using AI systems. Wildfire detection is possible by AI systems (i.e. through satellite data, aerial imagery, and GPS phone personnel position) and can help in the evacuation of people during wildfires, to investigate how householders responded in wildfires and spotting wildfire in real time using computer vision. Earthquake detection systems are now improving alongside the development of AI technology through measuring seismic data and implementing complex algorithms to improve detection and prediction rates. Earthquake monitoring, phase picking, and seismic signal detection have developed through AI algorithms of deep-learning, analysis, and computational models. Locust breeding areas can be approximated using machine learning, which could help to stop locust swarms in an early phase.

== Reception ==
=== Benefits ===
Algorithmic regulation is supposed to be a system of governance where more exact data, collected from citizens via their smart devices and computers, is used to more efficiently organize human life as a collective. As Deloitte estimated in 2017, automation of US government work could save 96.7 million federal hours annually, with a potential savings of $3.3 billion; at the high end, this rises to 1.2 billion hours and potential annual savings of $41.1 billion.

=== Criticism ===
There are potential risks associated with the use of algorithms in government. Those include:

- algorithms becoming susceptible to bias,
- a lack of transparency in how an algorithm may make decisions,
- the accountability for any such decisions.

According to a 2016's book Weapons of Math Destruction, algorithms and big data are suspected to increase inequality due to opacity, scale and damage.

There is also a serious concern that gaming by the regulated parties might occur, once more transparency is brought into the decision making by algorithmic governance, regulated parties might try to manipulate their outcome in own favor and even use adversarial machine learning. According to Harari, the conflict between democracy and dictatorship is seen as a conflict of two different data-processing systems—AI and algorithms may swing the advantage toward the latter by processing enormous amounts of information centrally.

In 2018, the Netherlands employed an algorithmic system SyRI (Systeem Risico Indicatie) to detect citizens perceived as being high risk for committing welfare fraud, which quietly flagged thousands of people to investigators. This caused a public protest. The district court of Hague shut down SyRI referencing Article 8 of the European Convention on Human Rights (ECHR).

The contributors of the 2019 documentary iHuman expressed apprehension of "infinitely stable dictatorships" created by government AI.

Due to public criticism, the Australian government announced the suspension of Robodebt scheme key functions in 2019, and a review of all debts raised using the programme.

In 2020, algorithms assigning exam grades to students in the UK sparked open protest under the banner "Fuck the algorithm." This protest was successful and the grades were taken back.

In 2020, the US government software ATLAS, which run on Amazon Cloud, sparked uproar from activists and Amazon's own employees.

In 2021, Eticas Foundation launched a database of governmental algorithms called Observatory of Algorithms with Social Impact (OASI).

A 2023 Annual Review synthesis highlights that regulating government use of AI requires sociotechnical design that addresses accountability, transparency, and bias.

==== Algorithmic bias and transparency ====
An initial approach towards transparency included the open-sourcing of algorithms. Software code can be looked into and improvements can be proposed through source-code-hosting facilities.

=== Public acceptance ===
A 2019 poll conducted by IE University's Center for the Governance of Change in Spain found that 25% of citizens from selected European countries were somewhat or totally in favor of letting an artificial intelligence make important decisions about how their country is run. The following table lists the results by country:

| Country | Percentage |
|---|---|
| France | 25% |
| Germany | 31% |
| Ireland | 29% |
| Italy | 28% |
| Netherlands | 43% |
| Portugal | 19% |
| Spain | 26% |
| UK | 31% |

Researchers found some evidence that when citizens perceive their political leaders or security providers to be untrustworthy, disappointing, or immoral, they prefer to replace them by artificial agents, whom they consider to be more reliable. The evidence is established by survey experiments on university students of all genders.

A 2021 poll by IE University indicates that 51% of Europeans are in favor of reducing the number of national parliamentarians and reallocating these seats to an algorithm. This proposal has garnered substantial support in Spain (66%), Italy (59%), and Estonia (56%). Conversely, the citizens of Germany, the Netherlands, the United Kingdom, and Sweden largely oppose the idea. The survey results exhibit significant generational differences. Over 60% of Europeans aged 25–34 and 56% of those aged 34–44 support the measure, while a majority of respondents over the age of 55 are against it. International perspectives also vary: 75% of Chinese respondents support the proposal, whereas 60% of Americans are opposed.

== In popular culture ==
The 1970 David Bowie song "Saviour Machine" depicts an algocratic society run by the titular mechanism, which ended famine and war through "logic" but now threatens to cause an apocalypse due to its fear that its subjects have become excessively complacent.

In the 1976 film Logan's Run, a domed city is ruled by a massive artificial intelligence known as the City Computer, which maintained a strict, hedonistic utopia by enforcing a maximum lifespan of 30, killing any citizen who reached that age through a ritual known as Carousel.

The novels Daemon (2006) and Freedom™ (2010) by Daniel Suarez describe a fictional scenario of global algorithmic regulation. Matthew De Abaitua's If Then imagines an algorithm supposedly based on "fairness" recreating a premodern rural economy.

In the 2003 sci-fi movie Code 46, "the Sphinx" is a massive, totalitarian insurance company that controls society via a computer that issues mandatory, genetically-encoded passports required for citizens to travel between heavily guarded, futuristic cities, and sets the strict rules for human movement and behavior.

== See also ==
- Anti-corruption
- Civic technology
- Code for America
- Cyberocracy
- Cyberpunk
- Cybersyn
- Digital divide
- Digital Nations
- Distributed ledger technology law
- Dutch childcare benefits scandal
- ERulemaking
- Lawbot
- Legal informatics
- Management cybernetics
- Multivac
- Post-scarcity
- Predictive analytics
- Sharing economy
- Smart contract

== General and cited references ==
- Lessig, Lawrence (2006). Code: Version 2.0. New York: Basic Books. ISBN 978-0-465-03914-2. OCLC 133467669. Wikipedia article: Code: Version 2.0.
- Oliva, Jennifer (2020-01-08). "Prescription-Drug Policing: The Right To Health Information Privacy Pre- and Post-Carpenter". Duke Law Journal. 69 (4): 775–853. ISSN 0012-7086.
- Szalavitz, Maia (October 2021). "The Pain Algorithm". WIRED. pp. 36–47. ISSN 1059-1028.
- Yeung, Karen; Lodge, Martin (2019). Algorithmic Regulation. Oxford University Press. ISBN 9780198838494.
