= First-party =

First-party may refer to:

- First-party developer
- First-party audit
