= Pross =

Pross is the surname of the following people:

- Addy Pross (born 1945), Israeli academic and author who is emeritus Professor of chemistry at the Ben-Gurion University of the
- Max Pross (born 1957), with Tom Gammill form an American comedy writing team
- Miss Pross, a fictional character in Charles Dickens' 1859 novel A Tale of Two Cities.
