= John Barnabas =

Indian evolutionary biologist

- Born: 12 October 1929; Mangalore, Karnataka, India
- Died: 30 July 1994 (aged 64); Pune, Maharashtra, India
- Education: University of Madras; University of Bombay; Yale University; University of Groningen
- Known for: Evolutionary genetics of hemoglobins
- Awards: 1974 Shanti Swarup Bhatnagar Prize; 1976 Sreenivasayya Memorial Award; 1989 INSA Golden Jubilee Commemoration Medal
- Scientific career
- Fields: Molecular systematics; Evolution
- Workplaces: Ahmednagar College; National Chemical Laboratory

John Barnabas (1929–1994) was an Indian evolutionary biologist, known for his contributions in the fields of Molecular Systematics and Evolution. He was a member of the Science Advisory Committee to the cabinet as well as the Department of Biotechnology of the Government of India. A Jawaharlal Nehru Fellow, Barnabas was also an elected fellow of the Indian Academy of Sciences, Indian National Science Academy and the National Academy of Sciences, India. The Council of Scientific and Industrial Research, the apex agency of the Government of India for scientific research, awarded him the Shanti Swarup Bhatnagar Prize for Science and Technology, one of the highest Indian science awards, in 1974, for his contributions to biological sciences.

== Biography ==
Born on 12 October 1929 in Mangalore, a port city in the south Indian state of Karnataka, John Barnabas did his early schooling at local schools before graduating in science from the University of Madras. Moving to Mumbai, he obtained his master's degree from University of Bombay and joined the then newly started Ahmednagar College as a member of faculty in 1954. He also continued his researches and secured a PhD from University of Pune in 1956. He served Ahmednagar College till 1981 during which time he held many positions such as that of a lecturer, a professor and a head of the department. In between, he had two stints abroad as a post-doctoral fellow, first at Yale University (1958–59) and then at Groningen University (1960–61). (Note: Morris Goodman of Wayne State University and Margaret Oakley Dayhoff of Georgetown University Medical Center were two of his associates in the US)

In 1983, Barnabas joined the National Chemical Laboratory as a Jawaharlal Nehru Fellow and after the tenure of the fellowship in 1985, he continued at the laboratory as the head of the Division of Biochemical Sciences. He worked there holding the Distinguished Fellowship of the Council of Scientific and Industrial Research from 1991 till his death on 30 July 1994, at the age of 64.

== Legacy ==
Barnabas was known to have done pioneering research on haemoglobins of mammals, with respect to the sequence of amino acids in them, and his studies helped in a wider understanding of the subject. He proposed novel methods by which the molecular structure is utilized in the measurement of evolutionary distance and the rate of change. His methods, based on parsimony analysis, assisted in developing phylogenetic trees and helped to understand the evolutionary history of different eukaryotic lineages. His research findings have been documented by way of a book, Phylogenetic Perspectives of Protists, and several articles.

Barnabas contributed in the establishment of the department of biochemistry at Ahmednagar College in 1963, when he returned to the college after his post-doctoral stint abroad. He served as the councilor of the International Society for the Study of Origin of Life from 1980 to 1983 and sat in the scientific advisory committees to the cabinet (1983–85) as well as the Department of Biotechnology (1990–93). He was also associated with the research councils of several scientific agencies including the Council of Scientific and Industrial Research and the advisory committee for space sciences of the Indian Space Research Organization. He was a member of journals such as Biotechnology Letters, Science Technology, Indian Journal of Biochemistry & Biophysics, Journal of Biosciences and the journals of the Indian Academy of Sciences (INSA) and the Indian National Science Academy. He also served as a member of the INSA council from 1984 to 1986.

== Awards and honors ==
Barnabas was awarded the Shanti Swarup Bhatnagar Prize, one of the highest Indian science awards, by the Council of Scientific and Industrial Research in 1974. He received the Sreenivasayya Memorial Award in 1976 and the same year, he was elected by the Indian Academy of Sciences as their fellow. Two years later, the University Grants Commission of India selected him as a National lecturer and the Indian National Science Academy elected him as their fellow in 1979. In 1983, his project, Phylogenetic Systematics Based on Molecular Data sets, was selected for the Jawaharlal Nehru Fellowship which he completed in 1985 at the National Chemical Laboratory.

Barnabas, who was a life member of the Society of Biological Chemists, India, presided the organization during 1985–86. INSA awarded him the Golden Jubilee Commemoration Medal in 1989. He was also a life member of the Society for Scientific Values, a member of the Guha Research Conference, a founder fellow of the Maharashtra Association for the Cultivation of Science and an elected fellow of the Institute of Chemical Technology (then known as University Department of Chemical Technology) and the National Academy of Sciences, India. The many award orations he delivered included Vyas Memorial Award Lectureship of the Association of Microbiologists of India (1986) and Salim Ali Memorial Lectureship Award of Indian Institute of Science.

== See also ==
- Molecular systematics
- Evolution
