= Telos =

Aristototelian concept of an object's final cause

Telos (/ˈtɛlɒs, ˈtiːlɒs/; Ancient Greek: τέλος, romanized: télos, lit. 'end, purpose, goal') is a term used by Greek philosopher Aristotle to refer to the final cause of a natural organ or entity, or of human art. The Greek word telos is the root of the modern term "teleology", the study of purposiveness or of objects with a view to their aims, purposes, or intentions. Teleology is central in Aristotle's work on plant and animal biology, and in his analysis of human ethics, through his theory of the four causes. Aristotle's notion that everything has a telos also gave rise to epistemology.

== In Aristotle ==
Telos has been consistently used in the writings of Aristotle, in which the term, on several occasions, denotes 'goal'. It is considered synonymous to teleute ('end'), particularly in Aristotle's discourse about the plot-structure in Poetics. The philosopher went as far as to say that telos can encompass all forms of human activity. One can say, for instance, that the telos of warfare is victory, or the telos of business is the creation of wealth. Within this conceptualization, there are telos that are subordinate to other telos, as all activities have their own respective goals.

For Aristotle, these subordinate telos can become the means to achieve more fundamental telos. Through this concept, for instance, the philosopher underscored the importance of politics and that all other fields are subservient to it. He explained that the telos of the blacksmith is the production of a sword, while that of the swordsman, who uses the weapon as a tool, is to kill or incapacitate an enemy. On the other hand, the telos of these occupations are merely part of the purpose of a ruler, who must oversee the direction and well-being of a state.

Moreover, it can be understood as the "supreme end of man's endeavour".

"Pleasure and pain moreover supply the motives of desire and of avoidance, and the springs of conduct generally. This being so, it clearly follows that actions are right and praiseworthy only as being a means to the attainment of a life of pleasure. But that which is not itself a means to anything else, but to which all else is a means, is what the Greeks term the Telos, the highest, ultimate or final Good. It must therefore be admitted that the Chief Good is to live agreeably." — Cicero, De Finibus Bonorum et Malorum, Book I

=== Telos vs techne ===
Telos is associated with the concept called techne, which is the rational method involved in producing an object or accomplishing a goal or objective. In the Theuth/Thamus myth, for instance, the section covering techne referred to telos and techne together. The two methods are, however, not mutually exclusive in principle. These are demonstrated in the cases of writing and seeing, as explained by Martin Heidegger: the former is considered a form of techne, as the end product lies beyond (para) the activity of producing; whereas, in seeing, there is no remainder outside of or beyond the activity itself at the moment it is accomplished. Aristotle, for his part, simply designated sophia (also referred to as the arete or excellence of philosophical reflection) as the consummation or the final cause (telos) of techne. Heidegger attempted to explain the Aristotelian conceptualization outlined in the Nicomachean Ethics, where the eidos – the soul of the maker – was treated as the arche of the thing made (ergon). In this analogy, the telos constitutes the arche but in a certain degree not at the disposition of techne.

== In modern philosophy ==
The notion of purpose, or telos, has formed the foundation of cybernetics, and is now part of the modern analysis of social media platforms as intelligent social machines.

Action theory also makes essential use of teleological vocabulary. From Donald Davidson's perspective, an action is just something an agent does with an intention – i.e., looking forward to some end to be achieved by the action. Action is considered just a step that is necessary to fulfill human telos, as it leads to habits.

According to the Marxist perspective, historical change is dictated by socio-economic structures (or "laws"), which are simultaneously preconditions and limitations of the realization of the telos of the class struggle.

== See also ==
- Conatus
- Dysteleology
- Metaphysics
- Plato
- Polytely
- Teleological argument
- Teleonomy
