= Peter Corning =

American scientist (born 1935)

- Born: Peter Andrew Corning; 1935 (age 90–91); Pasadena, California, U.S.
- Education: Brown University (B.A.); New York University (Ph.D.)
- Known for: Synergy in evolution, thermoeconomics
- Scientific career
- Fields: Complex systems, systems theory, cybernetics, evolution
- Workplaces: National Institute of Mental Health; University of Colorado; Stanford University; Institute for the Study of Complex Systems

Peter Andrew Corning (born 1935) is an American biologist, consultant, and complex systems scientist, Director of the Institute for the Study of Complex Systems, in Seattle, Washington. He is known especially for his work on the causal role of synergy in evolution.

== Biography ==
Peter Corning was born in Pasadena, California in 1935. He received his undergraduate BA from Brown University and completed a Doctor of Philosophy in interdisciplinary social science-life science at New York University. Later he was awarded a two-year National Institute of Mental Health Post-doctoral Fellowship for additional study and research at the Institute for Behavioral Genetics at the University of Colorado.

After graduating from Brown University, Corning served as a naval aviator and as a science writer at Newsweek magazine for two years before returning to graduate school. After his post-doctoral studies, he taught in the interdisciplinary Human Biology Program at Stanford University for nine years, along with research appointments in the Behavior Genetics Laboratory of the Stanford Medical School and in the Department of Engineering Economic Systems. Since 1991, Corning has served as the director of the Institute for the Study of Complex Systems and as a founding partner of a private consulting firm in Palo Alto, California.

He was President of the International Society for the Systems Sciences in 1999, and is Treasurer of the International Society for Bioeconomics and a member of the board of directors of the Association for Politics and the Life Sciences. He is also on the board of directors of the Epic of Evolution Society, and has been an actively contributing member of the International Society for Human Ethology, the Human Behavior and Evolution Society, the International Society for Endocytobiology, the European Sociobiological Society, and the International Association for Cybernetics. In 1996, he was also the recipient of a research fellowship in evolutionary biology at the Collegium Budapest, an international institute for advanced study, in Hungary.

== Work ==
Peter Corning's research interests are in the fields bioeconomics, and the research "in greater depth on specific sources and economic consequences of functional synergy in nature and its role in biological and socio-cultural evolution. One area of particular interest is molecular level cybernetic processes. Another concerns the progressive evolution of energy-capturing mechanisms".

Corning is known especially for his work on "the causal role of synergy in evolution. Other work includes a new approach to the relationship between thermodynamics and biology called "thermoeconomics", a new, cybernetic approach to information theory called "control information", and research on basic needs under the "Survival Indicators" Program".

In 2023 the book Evolution "On Purpose": Teleonomy in Living Systems co-edited by Corning along with Addy Pross, Stuart Kauffman, Denis Noble, James A. Shapiro and Richard I. Vane-Wright stated in the introduction that "Teleonomy in living systems is not, after all, only "apparent". It is a fundamental fact of life."

== Publications ==
Corning has written seven books and more than 200 research papers and articles over the years. A selection:

- 1969. The Evolution of Medicare: From Idea to Law. U.S. Social Security Administration.
- 1971. The Theory of Evolution as a Paradigm for the Analysis of Social Behavior. Ph.D.
- 1981. The Synergism Hypothesis: A Theory of Progressive Evolution. McGraw-Hill
- 2003. Nature's Magic : Synergy in Evolution and the Fate of Humankind. Cambridge U. Press
- 2005. Holistic Darwinism : Synergy, Cybernetics, and the Bioeconomics of Evolution. U. Chicago Press
- 2011. The Fair Society: The Science of Human Nature and the Pursuit of Social Justice. U. Chicago Press
- 2018. Synergistic Selection: How Cooperation Has Shaped Evolution and the Rise of Humankind. World Scientific

Selected Articles:

- 1971. "The Biological Bases of Behavior and Some Implications for Political Science." World Politics
- 1975. "Toward a Survival Oriented Policy Science." Social Science Information
- 1995. "Synergy and Self-Organization in the Evolution of Complex Systems." Systems Research
- 1996. "Synergy, Cybernetics, and the Evolution of Politics." International Political Science Review
- 1996. "The Co-operative Gene: On the Role of Synergy in Evolution." Evolutionary Theory
- 1996. To be or Entropy: Or Thermodynamics, Information and Life Revisited, A Comic Opera in Two Acts. With Stephen Jay Kline. Prepared for the International Society for the Systems Sciences Annual Meeting, Budapest, Hungary, September 1996.
- 1997. "Holistic Darwinism: 'Synergistic Selection' and the Evolutionary Process." Journal of Social and Evolutionary Systems
- 1998. "The Synergism Hypothesis: On the Concept of Synergy and Its Role in the Evolution of Complex Systems." Journal of Social and Evolutionary Systems
- 2000. "Biological Adaptation in Human Societies: A 'Basic Needs' Approach." Journal of Bioeconomics
- 2001. "'Control Information': The Missing Element in Norbert Wiener's Cybernetic Paradigm." Kybernetes
- 2002. "The Re-emergence of Emergence: A Venerable Concept in Search of a Theory." Complexity
- 2002. "Thermoeconomics: Beyond the Second Law." Journal of Bioeconomics
- 2007. "Synergy Goes to War: A Bioeconomic Theory of Collective Violence." Journal of Bioeconomics
- 2007. "Control Information Theory: The 'Missing Link' in the Science of Cybernetics." Systems Research and Behavioral Science
- 2008. "What is Life? Among Other Things, It's a Synergistic Effect." Cosmos and History
- 2010. "The Re-emergence of Emergence, and the Causal Role of Synergy in Emergent Evolution." Synthese
- 2013. "Evolution 'On Purpose': How Behaviour Has Shaped the Evolutionary Process." Biological Journal of the Linnean Society
- 2013. "Rotating the Necker Cube: A Bioeconomic Approach to Cooperation and the Causal Role of Synergy in Evolution." Journal of Bioeconomics
- 2016. "The Science of Human Nature and the Social Contract." Cosmos and History
- 2019. "Teleonomy and the Proximate-Ultimate Distinction Revisited." Biological Journal of the Linnean Society
- 2020. "Beyond the Modern Synthesis: A Framework for a More Inclusive Biological Synthesis." Progress in Biophysics and Molecular Biology
- 2021. "'How' vs. 'Why' Questions in Symbiogenesis, and the Causal Role of Synergy." BioSystems

== See also ==
- Teleogenesis
- Teleonomy
