= Social machine =

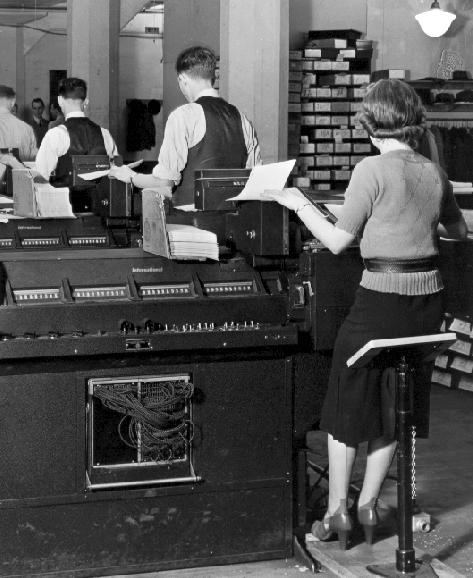
Early computing machinery was used to establish the US Social Security Administration. As the largest bookkeeping project in history, this would not have been possible without such technology.

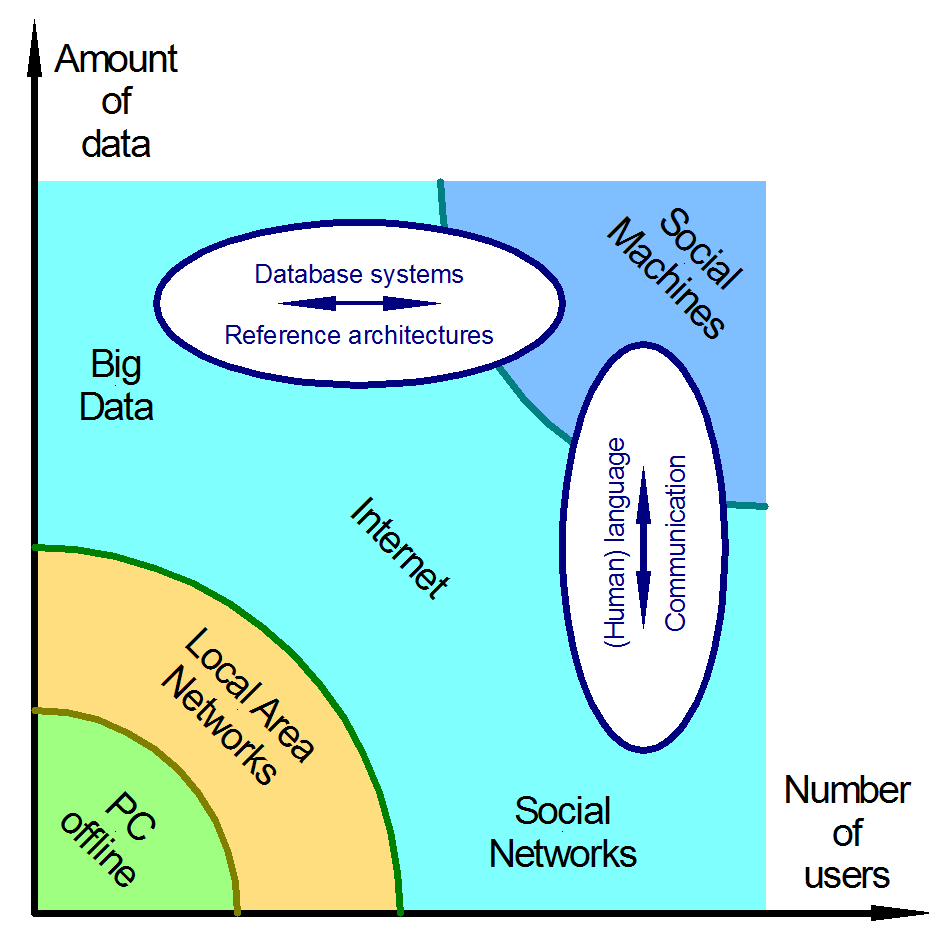
Graphical representation of social machines on the Internet that have access to big data in data bases via reference architectures and that communicate with many users in social networks via human language.

A social machine is an environment comprising humans and technology interacting and producing outputs or action which would not be possible without both parties present. It can also be regarded as a machine, in which specific tasks are performed by human participants, whose interaction is mediated by an infrastructure (typically, but not necessarily, digital). The growth of social machines has been greatly enabled by technologies such as the Internet, the smartphone, social media and the World Wide Web, by connecting people in new ways.

== Concept ==
The idea of social machines has been around for a long time, discussed as early as 1846 by Captain William Allen, and also by authors such as Norman Mailer, Gilles Deleuze and Félix Guattari.

Social machines blur the lines between computational processes and input from humans. They often take the form of collaborative online projects which produce web content, such as Wikipedia, citizen science projects like Galaxy Zoo, and even social networking site such as Twitter have also been defined as social machines. However, a social machine does not necessarily produce outcomes which directly affect the individuals or machines involved and an alternative viewpoint states that Social Machines are "rather than being an intentionally engineered piece of software - the substrate of accumulated human cross-system information sharing activities".

Nigel Shadbolt et al. say that the telos of the social machine is specific to its participants, whereas the telos of a platform is independent of its participants’ purposes; the platform is there to facilitate communication. A social machine may also spread across more than one platform, depending on how its participants interact, while a platform like Twitter could host many thousands of social machines.

An academic field investigating the idea has been active since Tim Berners-Lee's book Weaving the web. Social machines are characterised as 'social systems on the Web ... computational entities governed by both computational and social processes'. Tim Berners-Lee and James Hendler expressed some of the underlying scientific challenges with respect to AI research using semantic web technology as a point of departure.

Recent work focuses on the idea that certain social machines can be regarded as autonomous and goal-driven agents, and should be analysed and regulated as such. Nello Cristianini and Teresa Scantamburlo argued that the combination of a human society and an algorithmic regulation forms a social machine. Cristianini's book The Shortcut discusses extensively social machines as a model for many online platforms where participants automatically annotate content during usage, in this way contributing to the overall behaviour of the system.

== See also ==
- Augmented intelligence
- Crowdsourcing
- Government by algorithm
- Human-based computation
- Internet of things
- Social computing
- Social software
- Social technology
- Sociotechnical systems
