= Desk audit =

In audit management, a desk audit or desk review is a document review of an organization's documents. These reviews which do not require interviews or activity observation, can be conducted at a remote desk. Desk audits are conducted ahead of more costly thorough onsite process audits and system audits.

Internal desk audits are conducted by the organization, typically in preparation for an external desk audits that are conducted by an outside organization, such as a registrar.

== See also ==
- ISO 9000
