= Polytely =

Problem-solving technique

Polytely (from Greek roots poly- and -tel- meaning "many goals") comprises complex problem-solving situations characterized by the presence of multiple simultaneous goals. These goals may be contradictory or otherwise conflict with one another, requiring prioritisation of desired outcomes.

Polytely is a feature of complex problem-solving that adds difficulty to finding an optimum solution. Funke describes polytely as a feature "not... inherent in a system, but [referring] to certain decisions of the experimenter", especially decisions relating to what goals are to be followed in solving the problem. In the complex problem of nuclear waste disposal, Flüeler cites both trust between states (as a factor in nuclear proliferation: "Some states disarm whilst others re-arm – both do it for the sake of our planet's peace"), and safe and sustainable disposal of nuclear waste as situations where considering in terms of polytely helps elaborate and then balance important but conflicting goals.

== See also ==
- Cognitive science
- Concurrent computing
- Dietrich Dörner
- Game theory
- Goal-oriented
- Multi-agent system
- Multi-criteria decision analysis
- Multiobjective optimization
- Network science
- Organizational studies
- Outcome (game theory)
- Polycentric law
- Problem solving
- Systems theory
- Telos
