= Teleogenesis =

In the theory of cybernetics, teleogenesis (from the Greek teleos = 'purpose' and genesis = 'creation') is the creation of goal-creating processes.

According to Peter Corning: "A cybernetic system is by definition a dynamic purposive system; it is 'designed' to pursue or maintain one or more goals or end-states".

Teleogenesis refers from an extension of classical cybernetics, as proposed by Norbert Wiener, Ashby and others in late 1950s.

== See also ==
- Homeostasis
- Homeorhesis
