= Bernhard Schlegel =

German-born Canadian chemist

Hans Bernhard Schlegel FRSC
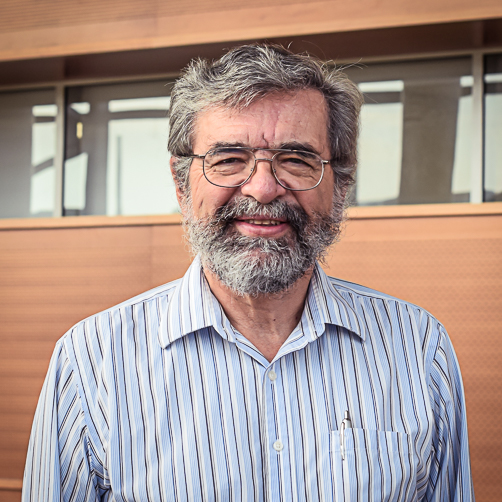
- Born: September 24, 1951 (age 75); Frankfurt am Main, Germany
- Known for: Co-author of Gaussian
- Awards: ACS Award for Computers in Chemical and Pharmaceutical Research (2013)

Academic background
- Education: Queen's University at Kingston (PhD)
- Doctoral advisor: Saul Wolfe

Academic work
- Discipline: Chemistry
- Sub-discipline: Computational and theoretical chemistry
- Institutions: Wayne State University

Hans Bernhard "Berny" Schlegel FRSC (born September 24, 1951) is a German-born computational and theoretical chemist, and distinguished professor at Wayne State University. He is a highly cited chemist, with a Thomson Reuters H-Index of 116 and citations of over 218,000 as of 2020. He is a professor of chemistry at the Wayne State University and co-author of the computational chemistry software, Gaussian. The "Berny optimization" as implemented in Gaussian is named after him. His group also created the Electronic Structure Perl Toolkit (ESPT).

Schlegel was born in Frankfurt am Main, and immigrated to Canada with his family at the age of four. He was raised in Windsor, Ontario, and graduated from the University of Waterloo in 1972. Schlegel earned a doctorate three years later, from Queen's University at Kingston, advised by Saul Wolfe, then pursued postdoctoral research with Kurt Mislow and Leland C. Allen at Princeton University before moving to Carnegie Mellon University to work with John Pople. Between 1978 and 1980, Schlegel was employed at Merck, Sharp, and Dohme Research Laboratories. Subsequently, Schlegel began his academic career at Wayne State as an assistant professor. He became a full professor in 1986, and a distinguished professor in 2011.

Schlegel has won the ACS Award for Computers in Chemical and Pharmaceutical Research and he is a Fellow of the American Association for the Advancement of Science, Fellow of the Royal Society of Chemistry, Fellow of the American Chemical Society and Academy of Scholars of Wayne State University, among others.

Schlegel with A Pross, SS Shaik, and S Wolfe co-authored "Theoretical Aspects of Physical Organic Chemistry. The SN2 Mechanism" which in 1994 was published in the Journal of the American Chemical Society.

He has co-authored more than 400 peer-reviewed publications. His most cited papers are:

- Gonzalez, H Bernhard Schlegel (1989) "An improved algorithm for reaction path following" The Journal of Chemical Physics, 94(4), 2154-2161 According to Google Scholar, it has been cited 5382 times.
- C Gonzalez, HB Schlegel (1990) "Reaction path following in mass-weighted internal coordinates (1990)," Journal of Physical Chemistry 94 (14), 5523-5527 According to Google Scholar, this article has been cited 5327 times.
- HB Schlegel "Optimization of equilibrium geometries and transition structures" Journal of Computational Chemistry 3 (2), 214-218

== Awards and fellowships ==
1.Alfred P. Sloan Fellowship (1981–83)

2.Camille and Henry Dreyfus Teacher Scholar (1984–89)

3.Academy of Scholars of Wayne State University (2001)

4.Fellow of the American Association for the Advancement of Science (2009)

5.Fellow of the Royal Society of Chemistry (2009)

6.Fellow of the American Chemical Society (2011)

7.ACS Award for Computers in Chemical and Pharmaceutical Research(2013)

== See also ==
- List of German Canadians
