= Kant's teleology =

Teleology is a philosophical idea where natural phenomena are explained in terms of the purpose they serve, rather than the cause by which they arise.

Kant's writing on teleology is contained in the second part of the Critique of Judgment which was published in 1790. The Critique of Judgment is divided into two parts with the first part Critique of Aesthetic Judgement and the second being Critique of Teleological Judgement. Within the first part Kant discusses and presents his ideas on aesthetics and within the second part Kant discusses how teleology has a role in our understanding of natural systems and the natural sciences. Kant's moral philosophy is also concerned with ends but only in relation to humans, (Note: Kant's distinction is based on a uniquely human capacity for rational thought.) where he considers it to be wrong to use an individual merely as means. The Critique of Teleology is concerned with ends in nature and so this discussion of ends is broader than in Kant's moral philosophy.

Kant's most remarkable claims within his description of natural teleology are that organisms must be regarded by human beings as “natural purposes” in the Analytic of Teleological Judgement and his arguments for how to reconcile his teleological idea of organisms with a mechanistic view of nature in Dialectic of Teleological Judgement.

Kant's claims about teleology have influenced both contemporary biology and the philosophy of biology.

== Purposiveness ==
Kant gives his first definition of an end in Critique of Aesthetic Judgement: “an end is the object of a concept [i.e. an object that falls under a concept] insofar as the latter [the concept] is regarded as the cause of the former [the object] (the real ground of its possibility).”(§10/220/105). Kant characterises an end as a one place predicate where if an object is intentionally produced by an agent then that object may be considered an end. For Kant an object is an end, if and only if, the concept which that object falls under is also the cause of that object.

In the Critique of Teleological Judgement when speaking of ends Kant describes causes “whose productive capacity is determined by concepts”, so the concept of an object determines the causality of the cause. This idea of causes leads to a more complicated definition of an end which is different to Kant's previous claims in the Critique of Teleological Judgement about the definition of an end. The concept of an object determines the causality of the cause as when an individual creates an object then the movement of that individual's arms in a particular way causes that object, but the movement of the individual's arms is determined by the individual's concept of the object. Beisbart uses this above example to show how the concept and cause of the object are related under this definition of purposiveness.

== Natural purposes ==
Kant presents the idea of a natural purpose in the Analytic of Teleological Judgment, where he argues that organisms such as plants and animal constitute a natural purpose and that they are the only natural things which do so. Kant characterises organisms as natural purposes through his definition of an ends claiming, “a thing exists as a natural end if it is the cause and effect of itself (in a twofold sense)”. To support this initial claim of natural ends Kant illustrates it through an example. A tree may be thought of as a natural end through three terms, (i) it originates from a tree of the same species, (ii) the tree grows from receiving alien material and (iii) the parts of the tree contribute to the function of the whole. Organisms display a reciprocity between part and whole which constitutes that organism as an end as the parts of an organism contribute to the function of the whole organism. As the character of the whole determines both the structure and the function of the parts Kant takes this relationship to mean that the tree is the cause of itself. Kant's initial definition of ends in §10 implies that the archetype of purposiveness is human creation as an end arises from a creator's concept which the individual planned to produce; the end is a result of a design. One issue with Kant's characterisation of natural purposes which was addressed by him in the Critique of Teleological Judgment and in the contemporary literature is how an organism may be both natural and an end when purposiveness is derived from design.

Kreines (2005) notes that the characterisation of natural purposes also applies to artefacts. Watches have parts as well which contribute to both the structure and the function of the whole watch and therefore this causal relationship between the parts and the whole in organisms is also present in artefacts. The coherence of a natural purpose is illusory without reconciling the natural characteristic of organisms with their purposiveness, so Kant provides a second qualification as to what signifies a natural purpose so “the parts of thing… are reciprocally cause and effect of their from”. This qualification is not met by artefacts as the parts of watch are not necessary for maintaining the other parts of said watch and are not produced by other parts of the watch.

Ginsborg (2001) attempts to resolve this issue in a different way to Kant by interpreting Kant's idea of purposiveness from a normative standpoint. so, when we regard something as a purpose, we claim that there is a specific way it ought to be. This normative distinction separates the idea of purposiveness from its prima facie requirement of a designer. We regard organs such as eyes to be purposes because they ought to be structured in a way which makes it possible for the organism to see. Artefacts such as rocks however are not regarded as purposes because there is no way in which we could say they ought to be. Rocks do serve purposes but not in this normative sense, for example they may be used to build houses, yet it is arbitrary to say they ought to be structured in a way in which allows them to build houses.

== Mechanism and teleology ==
In the Analytic Kant goes on to claim that the production of organisms is unable to be explained through a mechanical explanation and instead must be understood in teleological terms. Kant declares that it is “absurd for human beings…to hope that there may yet arise a Newton who could make conceivable even so much as the production of a blade of grass according to natural laws which no intention has ordered” (§75, 400), the fact that production of organisms cannot be explained in mechanical terms leads to a conflict which Kant calls “the antinomy of judgement”. “The antinomy of judgement” refers to the conflict between nature and natural objects with no mechanical explanation. We must aim to explain everything in nature in mechanical terms through scientific inquiry and yet some objects cannot be explained mechanically and should thus be explained in teleological terms. Furthermore, as purposiveness may not be sufficiently explained through mechanisms in nature then there is an essential feature which exists for natural objects which cannot be accounted by these natural laws. For example, during the ontogenetic process, the laws of physics determine the production of either a normal chick or an abnormal chick. From this viewpoint however as they both arise from the laws of physics there is nothing inherently special about the normal chick and hence the idea that the embryological process should lead to the production of a normal chick is arbitrary from this viewpoint.

Kant solution to "the antinomy of judgement" consists of the claim that the principle by which we should explain everything in mechanical terms and the principle that natural objects resist explanation in mechanical terms are both "regulative” and not "constitutive". What he means by this claim is that the principles only explain how we should investigate nature and they do not explain the true character of nature.

== Teleology of nature as a whole ==
Through reflecting on organisms as purposes Kant claims that we are led beyond this topic and thus reflect on nature as a whole. Though teleological judgements are catalysed by our experience of organism the scope of teleological judgements is not limited to organisms but may rather be extended to nature as a whole including organic artefacts. Kant makes two claims regarding the teleology of nature as a whole, first that everything in nature has a purpose and second that nature itself is a system of purposes which also has a purpose.

Nature presents itself with cases where features of an organism's environment, both organic and inorganic are both necessary and beneficial for that organism. Rivers are necessary for grass to grow and thus they are indirectly helpful for humans as they produce fertile land. Grass is necessary for agriculture which in turn provides food for carnivores through farming cattle. Kant provides a negative argument as to how we may account for this system without appealing to purposes. The origin of a river may be determined mechanically, and even though grass is regarded as a purpose due to its relation to itself, we do not have to determine its relative helpfulness to other living things in order to comprehend it. Kant does however reason that these natural objects, such as rivers, rocks and beaches do have a purpose in a relative sense. They have a purpose in a relative sense as long as they contribute towards the existence of a living thing which has an internal purpose.

These relative purposes provide the condition by which it is possible for nature to be a system of purposes where all organisms and natural objects are connected teleologically through relative purposiveness. The teleological idea of this system of purposes leads to both the idea of the ultimate purpose [letzter Zweck] of nature and the idea of the final purpose [Endzweck] of nature. The former pertaining to the idea of the existence of something within nature which all other things exist for its sake, with the latter being the idea that something exists outside of nature for which nature exists for its sake. Human experience does not lend itself to identify what the ultimate or final purpose may be, yet Kant argues that the final purpose can only be man as a moral agent.

== Influences of Kant's teleology on biology ==
Kant's teleology has influenced contemporary biological thought, particularly with scientists use of functional language in their characterisation of organism's parts and biological processes. Kant's writing on teleology has impacted contemporary biology as he addressed the problem of how it is possible for organisms to have functions and for biological purposes to exist without the presupposition of a divine designer existing.

One particular example of a contemporary biologist influenced by Kant's ideas may be seen in Roth (2014). The anti reductionist approach proposed by Kant, that organisms cannot be understood as composed of pre-existing parts, Roth (2014) argues that this approach may be used as a model for contemporary biology. Furthermore, Denis M. Walsh (2006) argues that Kant's characterisation of organisms as "natural purposes" ought to play a vital role in explaining ontogenetic development and adaptive evolution. As well as arguing against Kant's theory that natural purposiveness is not revealed through an objective principle of nature rather saying that purposiveness of organisms is a natural phenomenon through appealing to recent biological studies in self-organization. Walsh(2006) however believes that Kant's idea of organisms being natural purposes provides biological explanations.

== See also ==
- Teleonomy
