= Journal of Organometallic Chemistry =

- Discipline: Organometallic chemistry
- Language: English
- Edited by: R.D. Adams

Publication details
- History: 1964-present
- Publisher: Elsevier
- Frequency: Monthly
- Impact factor: 2.345 (2021)

Standard abbreviations
- ISO 4: J. Organomet. Chem.

Indexing
- ISSN: 0022-328X

Links
- Journal homepage; Online access

The Journal of Organometallic Chemistry is a peer-reviewed scientific journal published by Elsevier, covering research on organometallic chemistry. According to the Journal Citation Reports, the journal has a 2021 impact factor of 2.345.
