= Ute Deichmann =

Israeli historian of modern life sciences

Ute Deichmann (Hebrew: אוטה דייכמן) is an historian of modern life sciences. She is adjunct full professor at Ben-Gurion University of the Negev in Israel, where she was the founding director of the Jacques Loeb Centre for the History and Philosophy of the Sciences in 2007 and continues to be the director. She has also been an associate professor at the University of Cologne, Germany since 2011.

== Career ==
Ute Deichmann received her Ph.D. in 1991 at the Department of Genetics of the University of Cologne with the thesis Biologists under Hitler: The Expulsion of Jewish Scientists and the Development of Biological Research in Germany. She received her habilitation in 2000 at the same university with a thesis on chemists and biochemists in the era of National Socialism, published in 2001. She later became head of a working group on the history of modern biology and chemistry in the same department at the University of Cologne. From 2003 to 2007, she was a research professor at the Leo-Baeck-Institute in London where, together with Ulrich Charpa, she was the head of the project "Jews in German-Speaking Academia, 19th and 20th centuries". In 2007, Deichmann became founding director of the Jacques Loeb Centre for the History and Philosophy of the Life Sciences at Ben-Gurion University of the Negev in Beer Sheva. Since 2011, she has headed the center as an adjunct full professor.

== Research ==
Her research focuses on the history and philosophy of modern life sciences with an emphasis on:

- Tracing the origin of basic life sciences concepts such as biological specificity, hierarchy, genomic regulation, and epigenetics and how they have changed over time.
- Philosophy and epistemology of research in the experimental life sciences from the 19th to the 21st century and the impact of scientific personalities.
- Critically reviewing the methodology and philosophy behind scientific claims considered revolutionary by many scientists, but whose far-reaching implications were later rejected. Among them are biocolloidy in the early 20th century and extended epigenetics or the "epigenetics hype” in the 21st century.

From 1991-2003 she conducted major research on biology and chemistry in Nazi Germany and the forced emigration of Jewish scientists and developed a unique methodology for historical-political-scientific analysis.

== Awards ==
She is the recipient of the Ladislaus Laszt Award of Ben-Gurion University (1995) for her book Biologists under Hitler and the recipient of the Gmelin Beilstein Medal of the Society of German Chemical Society (2005) for her book Flee, Collaborate, Forget. In 2011, she was the recipient of the Outstanding Paper Award from the Division of the History of Chemistry of the American Chemical Society for her article “‘Molecular’ versus ‘Colloidal’: Controversies in Biology and Biochemistry, 1900-1940”.

== Publications ==
=== Books ===
==== Authored books ====
- Biologists under Hitler, Cambridge (Mass.), London: Harvard University Press, 1996
- Flüchten, Mitmachen, Vergessen. Chemiker und Biochemiker im Nationalsozialismus, (Flee, Collaborate, Forget: Chemistry and Biochemistry under National Socialism), Weinheim: Wiley/VCH, 2001

==== Edited books ====
- U. Charpa, U. Deichmann, 2007. Jews and Sciences in German Contexts. Case Studies from the 19th and 20th Centuries, Tübingen: Mohr-Siebeck.
- S. Wenkel, U. Deichmann, 2007. Max Delbrück and Cologne. An Early Chapter of German Molecular Biology, Singapore: World Scientific Publications, Inc.

=== Articles ===
- 2017. Hierarchy, determinism, and specificity in theories of development and evolution. History and Philosophy of the Life Sciences 39.4: 3-16.
- 2016. Epigenetics: The origin and evolution of a fashionable topic, Developmental Biology 416: 249-254
- 2016. The Beginnings of Israeli-German Collaborations in the Sciences: Motives, Scientific Benefits, Hidden Agendas. Israel Academy of Sciences and Humanities. Proceedings - Vol. IX, No. 3; pp. 35–86.
- 2014. Commemorating the 1913 Michaelis–Menten paper Die Kinetik der Invertinwirkung: three perspectives. FEBS Journal 81 (2): 435-463 doi 10.1111/febs.12598
- 2012. Crystals, Colloids or Molecules? Early Controversies about the Origin of Life and Synthetic Life. Perspectives in Biology and Medicine 55(4): 521–542.
- 2012. Beyond Popper and Polanyi: Leonor Michaelis, a critical and passionate pioneer of research at the interface of medicine, enzymology, and physical chemistry. Perspectives in Biology and Medicine 55(4): 612–626.
- 2011. Michael Polanyi on Scientific Authority and his Criticisms of Popper and Russell, Yearbook of the Leo Baeck Institute 56: 2419–268. London: Oxford University Press.
- 2010. Chemistry and Engineering Life around 1900 - Research and Reflections by Jacques Loeb. Biological Theory 4(4): 323–332.
- 2010. Gemmules and Elements: On Darwin's and Mendel's Concepts and Methods in Heredity. Journal for General Philosophy 41: 31–58.
- 2007. “Molecular” versus “Colloidal”: Controversies in Biology and Biochemistry, 1900–1940. Bulletin for the History of Chemistry 32: 105–118.
- 2004. Early Responses to Avery's et al.’s 1944 Paper on DNA as Hereditary Material. Historical Studies in the Physical and Biological Sciences 34:2, 207–233.
