= Journal of Physical Organic Chemistry =

- Discipline: Chemistry
- Language: English
- Edited by: Rik Tykwinski

Publication details
- History: 1988-present
- Publisher: John Wiley & Sons
- Frequency: Monthly
- Open access: Hybrid
- Impact factor: 2.155 (2021)

Standard abbreviations
- ISO 4: J. Phys. Org. Chem.

Indexing
- CODEN: JPOCEE
- ISSN: 0894-3230 (print); 1099-1395 (web)

Links
- Journal homepage; Online archive

The Journal of Physical Organic Chemistry is a monthly peer-reviewed scientific journal, published since 1988 by John Wiley & Sons. It covers research in physical organic chemistry in its broadest sense and is available both online and in print. The journal was founded in 1988 by Joseph B. Lambert of Northwestern University, who served as editor-in-chief until 2010. He was followed by Luis Echegoyen of the University of Texas at El Paso. The current editor-in-chief is Rik Tykwinski (University of Alberta).

== Highest cited papers ==
According to Web of Science the three most cited papers in the journal are:

1. Chiappe C, Pieraccini D. Ionic liquids: solvent properties and organic reactivity, 18(4): 275–297, 2005
2. Carmichael AJ, Seddon KR. Polarity study of some 1-alkyl-3-methylimidazolium ambient-temperature ionic liquids with the solvatochromic dye, Nile Red, 13(10): 591–595, 2000
3. Matyjaszewski K, Ziegler MJ, Arehart SV, et al. Gradient copolymers by atom transfer radical copolymerization, 13(12): 775–786, 2000

== Abstracting and indexing ==
The journal is indexed in Chemical Abstracts Service, Scopus, and Web of Science. According to the Journal Citation Reports, the journal has a 2021 impact factor of 2.155.
