= Life (journal) =

- Discipline: Life sciences
- Language: English
- Edited by: Pabulo Henrique Rampelotto

Publication details
- History: 2011–present
- Publisher: MDPI
- Frequency: Monthly
- Open access: Yes
- Impact factor: 3.2 (2022)

Standard abbreviations
- ISO 4: Life
- NLM: Life (Basel)

Indexing
- CODEN: LBSIB7
- ISSN: 2075-1729
- OCLC no.: 783891337

Links
- Journal homepage

Life is a peer-reviewed open access scientific journal published by MDPI. The journal was established in 2011 and covers all aspects of life sciences, from basic to applied research. It publishes reviews, research articles, short communications, perspectives, and hypotheses.

The journal is organized in 20 sections.

Since 2014, the journal offers open peer review (optional, at the authors' discretion).

== Abstracting and indexing ==
The journal is abstracted and indexed in Science Citation Index Expanded, Chemical Abstracts Service, and Scopus. According to the Journal Citation Reports, the journal has a 2022 impact factor of 3.2.

== Controversial article ==
In December 2011, the journal published Erik D. Andrulis' theoretical paper, "Theory of the Origin, Evolution, and Nature of Life", aiming at presenting a framework to explain life. It attracted coverage by the popular science and technology magazines Ars Technica and Popular Science, which characterized it as "crazy" and "hilarious". A member of the editorial board of Life resigned in response. The publisher defended the journal's editorial process, saying that the paper had been revised following lengthy reviews by two faculty members from institutions other than the author's.
