= Current Organic Chemistry =

- Discipline: Organic chemistry
- Language: English
- Edited by: György Keglevich

Publication details
- Publisher: Bentham Science Publishers (U.S.A)
- Impact factor: 1.933 (2019)

Standard abbreviations
- ISO 4: Curr. Org. Chem.

Indexing
- ISSN: 1385-2728
- OCLC no.: 37624231

Links
- Journal homepage

Current Organic Chemistry is a scientific review journal summarizing progress in the fields of asymmetric synthesis, organo-metallic chemistry, bioorganic chemistry, heterocyclic chemistry, natural product chemistry and analytical methods in organic chemistry. The journal is currently being edited by Dr. György Keglevich.

== Indexing information ==
Current Organic Chemistry is indexed in the following databases:

- British Library
- Cabell's Directory
- Chemical Abstracts Service/SciFinder
- Chemistry Citation Index
- ChemWeb
- CNKI Scholar
- Current Contents/Physical, Chemical & Earth Sciences
- Dimensions
- EBSCO
- Engineering Village/Chimica
- ERA 2018
- Genamics JournalSeek
- Google Scholar
- InCites
- Index Copernicus
- J-Gate
- Journal Citation Reports/Science Edition
- JournalTOCs
- MediaFinder-Standard Periodical Directory
- PubsHub
- QOAM
- Research Alert
- Science Citation Index Expanded (SciSearch)
- Scilit
- Scopus
- Suweco CZ
- TOC Premier
- Ulrich's Periodicals Directory
