= A. Aneesh =

Indian author and academic

Aneesh Aneesh is a sociologist of globalization, labor, and technology. He is Executive Director of the School of Global Studies and Languages at the University of Oregon and a Professor of Global Studies and Sociology. Previously, he served as a professor of sociology and director of the Institute of World Affairs and the global studies program at the University of Wisconsin, Milwaukee. In the early 2000s, he taught in the science and technology program at Stanford University and formulated a theory of algocracy, distinguishing it from bureaucratic, market, and surveillance-based governance systems, pioneering the field of algorithmic governance in the social sciences. Author of Virtual Migration: The Programming of Globalization (Duke 2006) and Neutral Accent: How Language, Labor and Life Become Global (Duke 2015), Aneesh is currently completing a manuscript on the rise of what he calls modular citizenship.

== Education ==
Aneesh studied Physics, Economics, and Philosophy at the University of Allahabad, earning a Bachelor's degree there in 1987. After pre-doctoral study in Philosophy at Jawaharlal Nehru University he came to the University of California, Irvine for a Master's degree in social relations in 1996, and completed a Ph.D. in Sociology at Rutgers University in 2001.

== Books ==
Aneesh has written or edited the following books:

- Neutral Accent: How Language, Labor and Life Become Global (2015)
- The Long 1968: Revisions and New Perspectives (co-edited, 2012)
- Beyond Globalization: Making New Worlds in Media, Art, and Social Practices (co-edited, 2011)
- Virtual Migration: the Programming of Globalization (2006)
