= Teleonomy =

Apparent purposefulness brought about by natural processes

Teleonomy is the quality of exhibiting purposefulness and of goal-directedness of structures and functions in living organisms brought about and causing natural processes like natural selection. The term derives from two Greek words, τέλος, from τελε-, ("end", "goal", "purpose") and νόμος nomos ("law"). Teleonomy is thought to derive from evolutionary history, adaptation for reproductive success, and/or the operation of a program. Teleonomy is related to programmatic or computational aspects of purpose.

== Relationship with teleology ==
Colin Pittendrigh, who coined the term in 1958, applied it to biological phenomena that appear to be end-directed, hoping to limit the much older term teleology to actions planned by an agent who can internally model alternative futures with intention, purpose and foresight:

Biologists for a while were prepared to say a turtle came ashore and laid its eggs. These verbal scruples were intended as a rejection of teleology but were based on the mistaken view that the efficiency of final causes is necessarily implied by the simple description of an end-directed mechanism. … The biologists long-standing confusion would be removed if all end-directed systems were described by some other term, e.g., 'teleonomic', in order to emphasize that recognition and description of end-directedness does not carry a commitment to Aristotelian teleology as an efficient causal principle.

In 1965 Ernst Mayr cited Pittendrigh and criticized him for not making a "clear distinction between the two teleologies of Aristotle"; evolution involves Aristotle's material causes and formal causes rather than efficient causes. Mayr adopted Pittendrigh's term, but supplied his own definition:

It would seem useful to rigidly restrict the term teleonomic to systems operating on the basis of a program of coded information.

Theodosius Dobzhansky later explained it this way in 1977:

Purposefulness, or teleology, does not exist in nonliving nature. It is universal in the living world. It would make no sense to talk of the purposiveness or adaptation of stars, mountains, or the laws of physics. Adaptedness of living beings is too obvious to be overlooked...Living beings have an internal, or natural, teleology. Organisms, from the smallest bacterium to man, arise from similar organisms by ordered growth and development. Their internal teleology has accumulated in the history of their lineage. On the assumption that all existing life is derived from one primordial ancestor, the internal teleology of an organism is the outcome of approximately three and a half billion years of organic evolution...Internal teleology is not a static property of life. Its advances and recessions can be observed, sometimes induced experimentally, and analyzed scientifically like other biological phenomena.

Richard Dawkins described the properties of "archeo-purpose" (by natural selection) and "neo-purpose" (by evolved adaptation) in his talk on the "Purpose of Purpose". Dawkins attributes the brain's flexibility as an evolutionary feature in adapting or subverting goals to making neo-purpose goals on an overarching evolutionary archeo-purpose. Language allows groups to share neo-purposes, and cultural evolution - occurring much faster than natural evolution - can lead to conflict or collaborations.

In behavior analysis, Hayne Reese made the adverbial distinction between purposefulness (having an internal determination) and purposiveness (serving or effecting a useful function). Reese implies that non-teleological statements are called teleonomic when they represent an "if A then C" phenomenon's antecedent; where, teleology is a consequent representation. The concept of purpose, as only being the teleology final cause, requires supposedly impossible time reversal; because, the future consequent determines the present antecedent. Purpose, as being both in the beginning and the end, simply rejects teleology, and addresses the time reversal problem. In this, Reese sees no value for teleology and teleonomic concepts in behavior analysis; however, the concept of purpose preserved in process can be useful, if not reified. A theoretical time-dimensional tunneling and teleological functioning of temporal paradox would also fit this description without the necessity of a localized intelligence. Whereas the concept of a teleonomic process, such as evolution, can simply refer to a system capable of producing complex products without the benefit of a guiding foresight.

In 1966 George C. Williams approved of the term in the last chapter of his Adaptation and Natural Selection; a critique of some current evolutionary thought. In 1970, Jacques Monod, in Chance and Necessity, an Essay on the Natural Philosophy of Modern Biology, suggested teleonomy as a key feature that defines life:

Rather than reject this [goal-directedness] idea (as certain biologists have tried to do) it is indispensable to recognise that it is essential to the very definition of living beings. We shall maintain that the latter are distinct from all other structures or systems present in the universe through this characteristic property, which we shall call teleonomy. [..] It will be readily seen that, in this or that species situated higher or lower on the animal scale, the achievement of the fundamental teleonomic project (i.e., invariant reproduction) calls assorted, more or less elaborate and complex structures and performances into play. The fact must be stressed that concerned here are not only the activities directly bound up with reproduction itself, but all those that contribute-be it very indirectly-to the species' survival and multiplication. For example, in higher mammals the play of the young is an important element of psychic development and social integration. Therefore this activity has teleonomic value, inasmuch as it furthers the cohesion of the group, a condition for its survival and for the expansion of the species.

In 1974 Ernst Mayr illustrated the difference in the statements:

"The Wood Thrush migrates in the fall in order to escape the inclemency of the weather and the food shortages of the northern climates."

"The Wood Thrush migrates in the fall and thereby escapes the inclemency of the weather and the food shortages of the northern climates."

If we replace the words ‘in order to escape’ by ‘and thereby escapes’, we leave the important question unanswered as to why the Wood Thrush migrates. The teleonomic form of the statement implies that the goal-directed migratory activity is governed by a program. By omitting this important message the second sentence is greatly impoverished as far as information content is concerned, without gaining in causal strength.

Subsequently, philosophers like Ernest Nagel further analysed the concept of goal-directedness in biology and by 1982, philosopher and historian of science David Hull joked about the use of teleology and teleonomy by biologists:

Haldane [in the 1930s] can be found remarking, ‘Teleology is like a mistress to a biologist: he cannot live without her but he’s unwilling to be seen with her in public.’ Today the mistress has become a lawfully wedded wife. Biologists no longer feel obligated to apologize for their use of teleological language; they flaunt it. The only concession which they make to its disreputable past is to rename it ‘teleonomy’.

== Examples in biology ==
Numerous examples of teleonomy exist across biology. For example, there is widespread cognitive behavior even at the cellular level among organisms such as microbes, animals, and plants.

Protozoa (both morphotypes: amoebae and ciliates) use "cellular sentience" and "intelligence" to obtain sufficient nutrients, resolve stressful situations, and find suitable mating partners. These microorganisms display many cognizant behaviors such as hunting (Lacrymaria olor) and predator-escaping tactics (Stentor), along with kin recognition among pathogenic amoebae.

In multicellular organisms, which have eukaryote cells, the immune and neural cells retain a protozoa-like nature with respect to their cognitive immune and neural functions. The innate immune system in animals and humans is based on numerous cell types, all of which closely resemble phagocytotic amoeba-like protozoa and they actively patrol and fight off foreign cells. Neural cells in animals resemble ciliated protozoa.

In the plant kingdom, forests constantly experience stress from environmental changes and there are sophisticated networks of plant roots that interact with fungal networks. These networks have cell-to-cell communication and exhibit neuronal-like electric and chemical signals in order to communicate with each other.

Sexual cells in plants and animals also appear and behave protozoa-like.

== Relationship to evolution ==
The concept of teleonomy was largely developed by Mayr and Pittendrigh to separate biological evolution from teleology. Pittendrigh's purpose was to enable biologists who had become overly cautious about goal-oriented language to have a way of discussing the goals and orientations of an organism's behaviors without inadvertently invoking teleology. Mayr was even more explicit, saying that while teleonomy certainly operates on the level of organisms, the process of evolution itself is necessarily non-teleonomic.

Mayr says, 'The existence of complex codes of information in the DNA of the germ plasm permits teleonomic purposiveness. On the other hand, evolutionary research has found no evidence whatsoever for a "goal-seeking" of evolutionary lines, as postulated in that kind of teleology which sees "plan and design" in nature. The harmony of the living universe, so far as it exists, is an a posteriori product of natural selection.

This attitude towards the role of teleonomy in the evolutionary process is the consensus view of the modern synthesis.

Evolution largely hoards hindsight, as variations unwittingly make "predictions" about structures and functions which could successfully cope with the future, and which participate in a process of natural selection that culls the unfit, leaving the fit to the next generation. Information accumulates about functions and structures that are successful, exploiting feedback from the environment via the selection of fitter coalitions of structures and functions. Robert Rosen has described these features as an anticipatory system which builds an internal model based on past and possible future states.

In 1962, Grace A. de Laguna's "The Role of Teleonomy in Evolution" attempted to show how different stages of evolution were characterized by different types of teleonomy. de Laguna points out that humans have oriented teleonomy so that the teleonomic goal is not restricted to the reproduction of humans, but also to cultural ideals.

In recent years, a few biologists believe that the separation of teleonomy from the process of evolution has gone too far. Peter Corning notes that behavior, which is a teleonomic trait, is responsible for the construction of biological niches, which is an agent of selection. Therefore, it would be inaccurate to say that there was no role for teleonomy in the process of evolution, since teleonomy dictates the fitness landscape according to which organisms are selected. Corning calls this phenomenon "teleonomic selection". Additionally, recent research has demonstrated that mutations are not random with reference to their value to the organism. Monroe and colleagues presented solid evidence that the most important genes undergo fewer mutations. If the phenomenon responsible for making the most important genes undergo fewer mutations remained an enigma, many would easily assume that there is some form of control systems (teleonomy) in the generation of mutations. Assuming this would be incorrect, as the phenomenon responsible for making genes more "protected" from mutations occurs completely automatically, without any teleonomic aspect.

== Philosophy ==
The Dutch Jewish philosopher Baruch Spinoza defined conatus as the tendency for individual things to persist in existence, meaning the pursuit of stability within the internal relations between their individual parts, in a similar way to homeostasis. Spinoza also rejected the idea of finalism and asserted nature does not pursue specific goals and acts in a deterministic although non-directed way.

In teleology, Kant's positions as expressed in Critique of Judgment, were neglected for many years because in the minds of many scientists they were associated with vitalist views of evolution. Their recent rehabilitation is evident in teleonomy, which bears a number of features, such as the description of organisms, that are reminiscent of the Aristotelian conception of final causes as essentially recursive in nature. Kant's position is that, even though we cannot know whether there are final causes in nature, we are constrained by the peculiar nature of the human understanding to view organisms teleologically. Thus the Kantian view sees teleology as a necessary principle for the study of organisms, but only as a regulative principle, and with no ontological implications.

Talcott Parsons, in the later part of his working with a theory of social evolution and a related theory of world-history, adopted the concept of teleonomy as the fundamental organizing principle for directional processes and his theory of societal development in general. In this way, Parsons tried to find a theoretical compromise between voluntarism as a principle of action and the idea of a certain directionality in history.

== Current status ==
Teleonomy is closely related to concepts of emergence, complexity theory, and self-organizing systems. It has extended beneath biology to be applied in the context of chemistry. Some philosophers of biology resist the term and still employ "teleology" when analyzing biological function and the language used to describe it, while others endorse it.

The introduction to the 2023 book Evolution "On Purpose": Teleonomy in Living Systems, edited by Peter Corning, Stuart Kauffman, Denis Noble, James A. Shapiro, Richard I. Vane-Wright and Addy Pross, concludes with the claim that "Teleonomy in living systems is not, after all, only "apparent". It is a fundamental fact of life."

== See also ==
- Autopoiesis
- Baldwin effect
- Conatus
- Kant's teleology
- Naturalism (philosophy)
- Orthogenesis
- T-symmetry
