= Journal of Social and Evolutionary Systems =

- Discipline: Sociobiology
- Language: English
- Edited by: Paul Levinson

Publication details
- Former name(s): Journal of Social and Biological Structures
- History: 1978–1998
- Publisher: JAI Press
- Frequency: Quarterly

Standard abbreviations
- ISO 4: J. Soc. Evol. Syst.

Indexing
- ISSN: 1061-7361
- LCCN: 94659030
- OCLC no.: 740969425

Links
- Journal homepage

The Journal of Social and Evolutionary Systems was a quarterly peer-reviewed scientific journal covering the intersection of biology and sociology. It was established in 1978 as the Journal of Social and Biological Structures by James Danielli and Harvey Wheeler, who served as its founding editors-in-chief; they were later joined by Robert Rosen. Wheeler remained a co-editor-in-chief of the journal until 1995.

The journal was originally published by Academic Press until 1990, when it was acquired by JAI Press. Also in 1990, Paul Levinson became the journal's new editor-in-chief. In 1992, Levinson changed its title to the Journal of Social and Evolutionary Systems in 1992. The journal ceased publication in 1998.
