= Origins of Life and Evolution of Biospheres =

- Discipline: Astrobiology
- Language: English
- Edited by: Alan W. Schwartz

Publication details
- History: 1968–present
- Publisher: Springer Science+Business Media
- Impact factor: 2.0 (2022)

Standard abbreviations
- ISO 4: Orig. Life Evol. Biosph.

Indexing
- ISSN: 0169-6149 (print); 1573-0875 (web)

Links
- Journal homepage

Origins of Life and Evolution of Biospheres is a peer-reviewed scientific journal established in 1968 covering astrobiology and origins of life research. It is the official journal of the International Astrobiology Society (previously known as the International Society for the Study of the Origin of Life). The journal's scope includes research on the origin, evolution, distribution, and future of life on Earth and beyond. Some examples of areas of interest are: prebiotic chemistry and the nature of Earth's early environment, self-replicating and self-organizing systems, the RNA world hypothesis and of other possible precursor systems, and the problem of the origin of the genetic code. According to the Journal Citation Reports, the journal has a 2022 impact factor of 2.0.

In January 2024, the journal was renamed Discover Life and became gold open access.

== Abstracting and indexing ==
The journal is abstracted and indexed in the following databases:

- Academic OneFile
- AGRICOLA
- Astrophysics Data System
- Biological Abstracts
- BIOSIS
- Chemical Abstracts Service
- CSA
- Current Contents/ Life Sciences
- Elsevier Biobase
- EMBASE
- EMBiology
- Gale
- GeoArchive
- GEOBASE
- GeoRef
- Geotitles
- IBIDS
- INIS Atomindex
- INSPEC
- Journal Citation Reports/Science Edition
- Mass Spectrometry Bulletin
- PubMed/Medline
- Science Citation Index
- SCOPUS
- Summon by Serial Solutions
