= Audit management =

Audit management is responsible for ensuring that board-approved audit directives are implemented. Audit management helps simplify and well-organise the workflow and collaboration process of compiling audits. Most audit teams heavily rely on email and shared drive for sharing information with each other.

Audit management oversees the internal/external audit staff, establishes audit programs, and hires and trains the appropriate audit personnel. The staff should have the necessary skills and expertise to identify inherent risks of the business and assess the overall effectiveness of controls in place relating to the company's internal controls.

Audits are classified as internal or external audits and are conducted as first-party, second-party, or third-party audits.

== Internal audit ==
Internal audit is a function set up within the organisation to reduce the risk of fraud in the organisation and runs according to the management commands. This is the main difference between internal and external audit where external auditors are independent of management and hence external auditors give an opinion on the financial statements as presented by the management of the organisation. This is performed by the companies internal auditing team, this can help companies improve because strengths and weaknesses are identified. Senior internal audit managers need to manage the responsibilities of what different people want.

Like all supervisor that are part of the business there is a need to:

- Understand what a person with an interest or concern in the business and customers want
- Agree aim and priorities
- Plan activities
- Establish resources and processes
- Record performance, making changes to keep things on track if required.

== External audit ==
The objectives of an external audit or audits being conducted by someone not part of the business, is when one business audits a different business to determine if the accounting records are complete and correctly prepared according to GAAP (GAAP is the highest U.S. power on accounting standards and they must be followed by jurisprudence when preparing financial information for businesses) provisions. The organisations have a formal agreement for the supply of goods and services. External audits make good business exercise.

Smaller businesses benefit from external audit because it can act as an education for small business owners, as many small business owners do not have an in-depth understanding of accounting. Businesses can use external auditor to spot mistakes that might have occurred and went noticed. Errors that occur in accounting statements can lead to businesses making bad decisions. For larger corporation audit provide confidence to the shareholder and investors that the figures shown in the books is reliable.

Companies have to appoint an auditor to do an annual external audit on your accounts if your business is:

- an authorised professional firm
- a BIPRU investment firm
- an insurance intermediary
- an investment management firm
- a mortgage administrator
- a mortgage intermediary
- a mortgage lender
- a personal investment firm
- a securities and futures firm
- a service company

== Third party audit ==
A third party audit gives feedback to important documents and processes including quality manuals or performance development plan, records including instructing, organisational charts, and examination of the processes within the extent of the audit. A third party audit is conducted by an audit organisation that does not have the traditional customer-supplier relationship and does not carry any conflict of interest. Institutions such as registrars (certification bodies) or legislature are usually the types of organisations that perform these types of audit.

== Managing an audit ==
Audit managers require strong leadership skills, workers prefer to work for someone that has moved up the ranks which shows that the manager they work with has experience doing the job team members are doing. Teams work efficiently, carrying out audit is time consuming so being organized improves productivity. Auditing involves planning, method, facts, procedures, controls, risk, and management. Auditors from different countries work with each other to help the same client, it is common for auditors to work directly at their client company in their offices.

== Audit directive and regulation ==
It is important that the United Kingdom economy has organised and effective capital markets and there is self-assurance in the business framework through greater transparency. Offering reliable and informative reporting supplies to this pledge. It includes the application of global accounting principles and global principles on auditing and requires an ongoing conversation with UK stakeholders and EU or international lawmakers on measures to encourage market firmness. Companies that are publicly traded may be required to submit an audit.

== See also ==
- Preventing fraud in government subsidies
- Audit software in governmental procurement
