= Nello Cristianini =

Italian computer scientist (born 1968)

- Born: 1968 (age 57–58); Gorizia, Italy
- Education: University of Trieste; Royal Holloway, University of London; University of Bristol
- Known for: Statistical learning, media content analysis, support vector machines, Philosophy of artificial intelligence
- Awards: Royal Society Wolfson Research Merit Award, ERC Advanced Grant
- Scientific career
- Fields: Artificial intelligence
- Workplaces: University of Bath; University of Bristol; University of California, Davis; Royal Holloway, University of London
- Website: researchportal.bath.ac.uk/en/persons/nello-cristianini/

Nello Cristianini (born 1968) is a professor of Artificial Intelligence in the Department of Computer Science at the University of Bath.

== Education ==
Cristianini holds a degree in physics from the University of Trieste, a Master in computational intelligence from Royal Holloway, University of London and a PhD from the University of Bristol. Previously he has been a professor of Artificial Intelligence at the University of Bristol, an associate professor at the University of California, Davis, and held visiting positions at other universities.

== Research ==
His research contributions encompass the fields of machine learning, artificial intelligence and bioinformatics. Particularly, his work has focused on statistical analysis of learning algorithms, to its application to support vector machines, kernel methods and other algorithms. Cristianini is the co-author of two widely known books in machine learning, An Introduction to Support Vector Machines and Kernel Methods for Pattern Analysis and a book in bioinformatics, "Introduction to Computational Genomics".

Recent research has focused on the philosophical challenges posed by modern artificial intelligence, big-data analysis of newspapers content, the analysis of social media content. Previous research had focused on statistical pattern analysis; machine learning and artificial intelligence; machine translation; bioinformatics.

As a practitioner of data-driven AI and Machine Learning, Cristianini frequently gives public talks about the need for a deeper ethical understanding of the effects of modern data-science on society. His book "The Shortcut" is devoted to the philosophical foundations of Artificial Intelligence and its potential risks for individuals and society.

== Awards and honours ==
Cristianini is a recipient of the Royal Society Wolfson Research Merit Award and of a European Research Council Advanced Grant. In June 2014, Cristianini was included in a list of the "most influential scientists of the decade" compiled by Thomson Reuters (listing the top one per cent of scientists who are "the world’s leading scientific minds" and whose publications are among the most influential in their fields). In December 2016 he was included in the list of Top100 most influential researchers in Machine Learning by AMiner. In 2017, Cristianini was the keynote speaker at the Annual STOA Lecture at the European Parliament. From 2020 to 2024 he was a member of the International Advisory Board of STOA (Panel for the Future of Science and Technology of the European Parliament).

== Books ==
- 2000: An Introduction to Support Vector Machines and Other Kernel-based Learning Methods, Nello Cristianini and John Shawe-Taylor
- 2004: Kernel Methods for Pattern Analysis, Nello Cristianini and John Shawe-Taylor
- 2006: Intro Computational Genomics, Matthew William Hahn and Nello Cristianini
- 2014: The Last Summer: Story of Lucy Christalnigg and the End of a World, Nello Cristianini
- 2023: The Shortcut: Why Intelligent Machines Do Not Think Like Us, Nello Cristianini, CRC Press
- 2025: Machina Sapiens, Nello Cristianini, CRC Press
- 2025: Sovrumano (Edizioni Il Mulino), Superhuman (CRC Press, 2026)
- 2026: Forma Mentis (Edizioni Il Mulino)
