= George Chapman (disambiguation) =

George Chapman (c. 1559–1634) was an English dramatist, translator, and poet.

George Chapman may also refer to:

- George Chapman (murderer) (1865–1903), Polish-born English serial killer a.k.a. Sverin Antoniovich Klosowski
- George Chapman (healer) (1921–2006), British trance healer and medium
- George Chapman (cricketer) (1904–1986), Australian cricketer
- George Chapman (footballer, born 1886) (1886–?), Scottish footballer with Blackburn Rovers and Rangers
- George Chapman (footballer, born 1920) (1920–1998), English footballer with Brighton & Hove Albion
- George Chapman (businessman), businessman from Queensland, Australia
- George Chapman (Dubai) (1925–2023), English businessman
- George B. Chapman (1925–2016), Georgetown University professor and biologist
- George W. Chapman (footballer) (1909–1980), Australian rules footballer for St Kilda between 1931 and 1935
- George L. Chapman (1909–2003), Australian rules footballer for Fitzroy in 1932 and St Kilda in 1933
- George Chapman (party president) (born 1927), New Zealand political leader
- George Henry Chapman (1832–1882), American Civil War general
- George W. Chapman (politician) (1832–?), American lawyer and politician from New York
- George Thomson Chapman (1824–1881), New Zealand merchant, bookseller and publisher
