= Glossary of systems theory =

A glossary of terms relating to systems theory.

== A ==
- Adaptive capacity: An important part of the resilience of systems in the face of a perturbation, helping to minimise loss of function in individual human, and collective social and biological systems.
- Allopoiesis: The process whereby a system produces something other than the system itself.
- Allostasis: The process of achieving stability, or homeostasis, through physiological or behavioral change.
- Autopoiesis: The process by which a system regenerates itself through the self-reproduction of its own elements and of the network of interactions that characterize them. An autopoietic system renews, repairs, and replicates or reproduces itself in a flow of matter and energy. Note: from a strictly Maturanian point of view, autopoiesis is an essential property of biological/living systems.

== B ==
- Black box: A technical term for a device or system or object when it is viewed primarily in terms of its input and output characteristics, without observing or describing its internal structure or behaviour.
- Boundaries: The parametric conditions, often vague, always subjectively stipulated, that delimit and define a system and set it apart from its environment.

== C ==
- Cascading failure: Failure in a system of interconnected parts, where the service provided depends on the operation of a preceding part, and the failure of a preceding part can trigger the failure of successive parts.
- Closed system: A system which can exchange energy (as heat or work), but not matter, with its surroundings.
- Complexity: A complex system is characterised by components that interact in multiple ways and follow local rules. A complicated system is characterised by its layers.
- Culture: The result of individual learning processes that distinguish one social group of higher animals from another. In humans culture is the set of interrelated concepts, products and activities through which humans group themselves, interact with each other, and become aware of themselves and the world around them.

== D ==
- Development: The process of liberating a system from its previous set of limiting conditions. It is an amelioration of conditions or quality.
- Dissipative structure: A term invented by Ilya Prigogine to describe complex chemical structures undergoing the process of chemical change through the dissipation of entropy into their environment, and the corresponding importation of "negentropy" from their environment. Also known as syntropic systems.

== E ==
- Embeddedness: A state in which one system is nested in another system.
- Emergence: The appearance of novel characteristics exhibited on the level of the whole ensemble, but not by the components in isolation.
- Enantiostasis: The ability of an open system, especially a living organism, to stabilize and conserve function in spite of an unstable environment.
- Entanglement: A state in which the manner of being, or form of existence, of one system is inextricably tied to that of another system or set of systems.
- Entropy: In physics, entropy is a measure of energy that is expended in a physical system but does no useful work, and tends to decrease the organizational order of the system.
- Environment: The context within which a system exists. It is composed of all things that are external to the system, and it includes everything that may affect the system, and may be affected by it at any given time.
- Equifinality: In open systems, the principle that the same final state can be reached from different initial conditions, or in different ways.
- Evolution: A tendency toward greater structural complexity, ecological and/or organizational simplicity, more efficient modes of operation, greater dynamic harmony, etc. As a cosmic process, it is not limited to the domain of biological phenomena, but extends to include all aspects of change in open dynamic systems with a throughput of information and energy.
- Evolutionary systems: A type of system which reproduces with mutation.

== F ==
- Feedback: A functional monitoring signal obtained from a given dynamic and continuous system. A feedback function only makes sense if this monitoring signal is looped back into an eventual control structure within a system and compared with a known desirable state. The difference between the feedback monitoring signal and the desirable state of the system gives the notion of error. The amount of error can guide corrective actions in the system that can bring the system back to the desirable state.

== H ==
- Heterarchy: An ordering of things in which there is no single peak or leading element, and in which the element that is dominant at a given time depends on the total situation. The term is often used in contrast to hierarchy, i.e. a vertical arrangement of entities (systems and their subsystems), usually ordered from the top downwards rather than from the bottom upwards.
- Holarchy: A concept invented by Arthur Koestler to describe behavior that is partly a function of individual nature and partly a function of the nature of the embedding system, generally operating in a bottom upwards fashion.
- Holism: A non-reductionist descriptive and investigative strategy for generating explanatory principles of whole systems. Attention is focused on the emergent properties of the whole rather than on the reductionist behavior of the isolated parts.
- Holon (philosophy): A whole in itself as well as a part of a larger system.
- Homeorhesis: A concept encompassing dynamical systems which return to a trajectory, as opposed to systems which return to a particular state, which is termed homeostasis.
- Homeostasis: The property of either an open system or a closed system (especially a living organism) which regulates its internal environment so as to maintain a stable, constant condition.
- Human activity systems: Designed social systems organized for a purpose, which they attain by carrying out specific functions.

== I ==
- Isolated system: A system in which the total energy-mass is conserved without any external exchange happening.

== L ==
- Lowerarchy: A specific type of hierarchy involving a 'bottom up' arrangement of entities such that the few are influenced by the many.

== M ==
- Metastability: The ability of a non-equilibrium state to persist for some period of time.
- Model building: A disciplined inquiry by which a conceptual (abstract) representation of a system is constructed or a representation of expected outcomes/output is portrayed.

== O ==
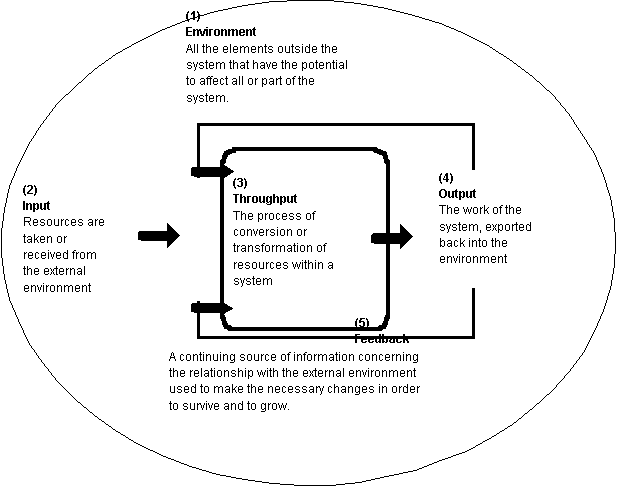
Open System Model (basics)

- Open system: A state and characteristics of that state in which a system continuously interacts with its environment. Open systems are those that maintain their state and exhibit the characteristics of openness previously mentioned.
- Structure–organization–process: See Structure–organization–process for various definitions.

== P ==
- Process: A naturally occurring or designed sequence of actions of an agent or changes of properties or attributes of an object or system.
- Process model: An organized arrangement of systems concepts and principles that portray the behavior of a system through time. Its metaphor is the "motion-picture" of "movie" of the system.
- Structure–organization–process: See Structure–organization–process for various definitions.

== R ==
- Reductionism: One kind of scientific orientation that seeks to understand phenomena by a) breaking them down into their smallest possible parts (a process known as analytic reductionism), or conversely b) conflating them to a one-dimensional totality (a process known as holistic reductionism).

== S ==
- Self-organization: A process in which the internal organization of a system, normally an open system, increases in complexity without being guided or managed by an outside source.
- Self-organizing systems: Systems that typically (though not always) display emergent properties.
- Space system: A collection of elements that work together to perform a task involving the space environment.
- Steady state: A state in which the variables (called state variables) which define the behavior of a system or a process are unchanging in time. In chemistry, it is a more general situation than dynamic equilibrium. If a system is in steady state then the recently observed behaviour of the system will continue into the future. In stochastic systems, the probabilities that various states will be repeated will remain constant.
- Strong emergence: A type of emergence in which the emergent property is irreducible to its individual constituents.
- Structure–organization–process: See Structure–organization–process for various definitions.
- Subsystem: A major component of a system. It is made up of two or more interacting and interdependent components. Subsystems of a system interact in order to attain their own purpose(s) and the purpose(s) of the system in which they are embedded.
- Suprasystem: The entity that is composed of a number of component systems organized in interacting relationships in order to serve their embedding suprasystem.
- Sustainability: The ability of a system to maintain itself with no loss of function for extended periods of time. In human terms it is an ideal of creative and responsible stewardship of resources—human, natural, and financial—to generate stakeholder value while contributing to the well-being of current and future generations of all beings.
- Synchrony or synchronicity: In engineering; concurrence of periods and/or phases; simultaneity of events or motions: contemporaneous occurrences. In evolutionary systems thinking; a fortunate coincidence of phenomenon and/or of events.
- Synergy: The process by which a system generates emergent properties resulting in the condition in which a system may be considered more than the sum of its parts, or equal to the sum of its parts plus their relationships.
- Syntony: In evolutionary systems thinking, evolutionary consonance, the occurrence and persistence of an evolutionarily tuned dynamic regime, a purposeful creative aligning and tuning with the evolutionary flows of one's milieu. In traditional radio engineering, a condition in which two oscillators have the same resonant frequency.
- Syntropy: The process of negentropy-importation. A syntropic system is a dissipative structure.
- Systems design: A decision-oriented disciplined inquiry that aims at the construction of a model that is an abstract representation of a future system.
- Soft systems methodology: A systemic approach for tackling real-world problematic situations, an approach which provides a problem-structuring framework for users to deal with the kind of messy problem situations that lack a formal problem definition.

== W ==
- Weak emergence: A type of emergence in which the emergent property is reducible to its individual constituents.
- White-box testing: A technical term for a device or system analyzed or tested based on knowledge of its internal structure (compare to Black box).
- Wholeness: In reference to systems, the condition in which systems are seen to be structurally divisible, but functionally indivisible wholes with emergent properties.

== See also ==
- Glossary of Unified Modeling Language terms
- List of basic science topics
- List of glossaries
- List of types of systems theory
