= Urgesellschaft =

Coexistence of humans in prehistory

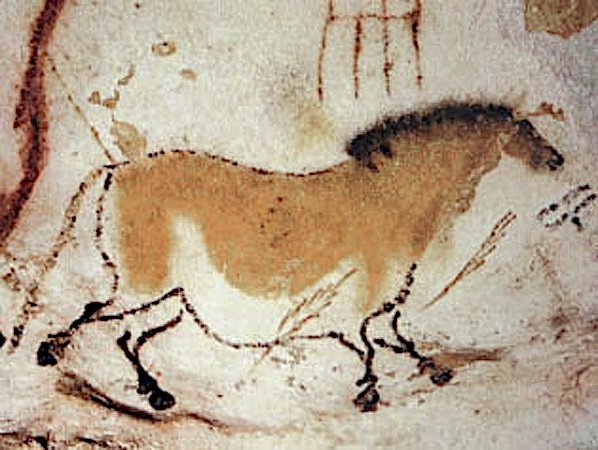
Image of a horse from the Lascaux caves made by the Cro-Magnon peoples at their hunting route in the Stone age

Urgesellschaft (German, 'primal society') is a term that, according to Friedrich Engels, refers to the original coexistence of humans in prehistoric times, before recorded history. Here, a distinction is made between the kind of Homo sapiens as humans, who hardly differed from modern humans biologically (an assertion disputed by anthropology), and other representatives of the genus Homo such as the Homo erectus or the Neanderthal. Engels claimed "that animal family dynamics and human primitive society are incompatible things" because "the primitive humans that developed out of animalism either knew no family at all or at most one that does not occur among animals". The U.S. anthropologist Lewis Henry Morgan and translations of his books also make use of the term.

In specificity, this long period of time is not directly accessible through historical sources. Nevertheless, in archaeology, the study of material cultures provides a variety of opportunities to gain a better understanding of this period, work that is likewise present in sociobiology and social anthropology, and in religious studies through the analysis of prehistoric mythologies.

== Archaeological classification ==
The so-called primitive society, or more appropriately, the primitive societies, probably span by far the longest period in the history of mankind to date, more than three million years, while other forms of society have existed and continue to exist for only a relatively short period in comparison (less than 1 percent of the period).

The Stone Age is an archaeological term for the period in which stone tools (fist wedges) are the oldest chronologically classifiable and roughly datable finds. Other, even older tools and objects made of natural or animal materials (wood, bones, skins) decayed and did not survive. This Stone Age also includes the development of new social structures about 20,000 to 6,000 years ago. Generally, the advent of arable farming and livestock rearing is considered to be the transition to the New Stone Age and the end of this phase. The Neolithic Revolution was followed in some areas by the Bronze Age (around 2200 to 800 BC), but in some cases ran in parallel.

Age	Period	Duration	Human species
Stone Age	Paleolithic	Lower Paleolithic: 3.3 Ma–300 ka Middle Paleolithic: 300–50 ka Upper Paleolithic: 50,000–12,000 BC	Homo habilis, Homo erectus, Homo heidelbergensis In Middle Paleolithic: Homo neanderthalensis, Homo sapiens
Stone Age	Mesolithic	Europe: 15,000–5,000 BC Middle east: 20,000–10,000 BC	Homo sapiens
Stone Age	Neolithic	10,000–4,500 BC (2,200 BC in Western Europe)	Homo sapiens
Bronze Age	Early Bronze Age Middle Bronze Age Late Bronze Age	3300–1200 BC (900 BC in Europe)	Homo sapiens
Iron Age		Between 2000 BC and 800 AD, greatly varies per region	Homo sapiens

== Theoretical assumptions ==
A society is formed by different-sized social groups acting together. At different times in history, as well as in different climates and ecozones, human societies were quite different.

The gradual dispersal of early human groups (estimated at 1 to 10 kilometers per year) initially placed few demands on them and their generational succession-they did not perceive any changes, especially in equatorial regions. However, drastic environmental changes such as ice and warm periods, to which the migrants were exposed in the target area, caused new forms of adaptation with corresponding social structures. Food gathering and weather protection as well as the use of fire were socially successful. However, a high social differentiation of primitive social forms of organization cannot be assumed. The first graspable societies as well as similar present groups appear relatively equal (egalitarian).

The isolation of individual groups, e.g. during the glacial periods or in insular settlement areas, led to culturally different traditions as well as to phenotypic, also racial theoretical differentiations. The comparatively rare contacts were found by a pedestrian, overall stationary society in the nearest vicinity. Whether the exogamy (external marriage) indicates that people became aware of reproductive biology (procreation) is doubted; exogamy is sociologically seen rather as a proving safeguard of (re-)integration of diverging groupings (for example, in lineage or clan alliances with intermarriage).

Some religious traditions also speak of a primal society, referring to the preforms of later religions spread across all hunter-gatherer groupings, derived from the social practices of their members. In written cultures, the distinction between shepherds and cultivators that persists to this day is evident, for example, in the biblical Story of Cain and Abel. Still, in modern macrosociological theories, there are sophisticated assumptions about common features of a primitive society, for instance in Thomas Hobbes, Jean-Jacques Rousseau and Friedrich Engels.

Whether early humans lived dominion-free or anarchic or already formed consolidated leadership positions (chiefs) is in each case only a justifiable assumption, the same going for whether they organized themselves as social hordes, cultivated religious cults (with ancestor cult or totemism?) and culturally already knew narrators or familially already the Kernfamilie. Economically, this society is based on an occupation economy, depending on the geological time or vegetation zone to dictate whether one takes the profession of hunter, fisherman, or gatherer. During the Ice Age, for example, their focus in Central Europe and North America was on hunting, while elsewhere gathering and fishing also became important, as in Central Europe after the migration of large animal fauna in the Middle Stone Age (compare Scandinavian middens).

In Marxist theory on the social development of mankind, especially in historical materialism, primitive society is also called classless primitive communism because, just as in the "communism" that followed capitalism, there was no private property in the means of production.

== See also ==
- Lewis Henry Morgan: Die Urgesellschaft (Ancient Society, USA 1877)
- Primitive communism
- Gesellschaft

== Literature ==
- Dieter Claessens: Das Konkrete und das Abstrakte. Soziologische Skizzen zur Anthropologie. Suhrkamp, Frankfurt 1993, ISBN 3-518-28708-7.
- Friedrich Engels: Anteil der Arbeit an der Menschwerdung des Affen. SAV, Berlin 2009 (original: 1876).
- Lewis Henry Morgan: Die Urgesellschaft oder Untersuchung über den Fortschritt der Menschheit aus der Wildheit durch die Barbarei zur Zivilisation. 1891 (Nachdruck: Achenbach, Lahn 1979; US-Original 1877: Ancient Society, Or: Researches in the lines of human progress from savagery through barbarism to civilisation).
- Hansjürgen Müller-Beck: Die Steinzeit. Der Weg der Menschen in die Geschichte. 4., durchgesehene und aktualisierte Ausgabe. Beck, München 2004, ISBN 978-3-406-47719-5.
- Joachim Herrmann, Irmgard Sellnow (Hrsg.): Produktivkräfte und Gesellschaftsformationen in vorkapitalistischer Zeit. Akademie, Berlin 1982 (= Veröffentlichungen des Zentralinstituts für Alte Geschichte und Archäologie der Akademie der Wissenschaften der DDR. Band 12).
