= Autopoiesis and Cognition: The Realization of the Living =

1972 book by Humberto Maturana and Francisco Varela

- Authors: Humberto Maturana and Francisco Varela
- Original title: De Maquinas y Seres Vivos (English: 'On Machines and Living Beings')
- Language: Spanish (original), English (translated)
- Series: Boston Studies in the Philosophy of Science (Volume 42)
- Subject: Cybernetics, systems theory, philosophy of biology
- Genre: Non-fiction
- Publisher: Editorial Universitaria S.A. (1972); - D. Reidel Publishing Company (1980): Springer (1991)
- Publication date: 1972 (Chile); - 1980 (Holland): 1991 (Springer)
- Publication place: Chile

Autopoiesis and Cognition: The Realization of the Living is a cybernetic work in systems theory and the philosophy of biology by Humberto Maturana and Francisco Varela. It was first published under the title De Maquinas y Seres Vivos (English: 'On Machines and Living Beings') in 1972 in Chile by Editorial Universitaria S.A., with a second edition published in 1980 by the D. Reidel Publishing Company, Dordrecht, Holland, and a third edition published in 1991 by Springer. This work defines and explores the concept of autopoiesis, or 'self-creation' in biological systems in an effort to address cognition and autonomy in living systems. Autopoiesis was a core text for the field of second-order cybernetics, which often dealt with themes of self-reference and feedback loops. The book is the 42nd volume in the series Boston Studies in the Philosophy of Science.

== Reception ==
Autopoiesis and Cognition was most widely read as a work of systems theory. Reviews of the work praise it as an effort by scientists to bring their science to bear while crafting a phenomenology of biology, and addressing such important questions as the basis of life and cognition. However, reviewers also point out inconsistencies in the formal argument that Maturana and Varela are attempting to make. Reviewer M.G. writes in The Review of Metaphysics (v. 35, 1981),

It seems to me that the authors' claim to be able to say what is cognition by means of a biological cognition collapses on itself. The notion of autopoiesis defines a phenomenological domain which then excludes all descriptions irrelevant to the autopoietic unity. This is a patent circularity.

The concepts introduced by the work were quite divisive, and a debate over their validity has continued since their introduction, in fields such as biology, sociology, organizational management, and systems theory.

== Influence ==
=== Sociology ===
Sociologist and social systems theorist Niklas Luhmann adapted the ideas from Autopoiesis to describe social systems, as did cyberneticist Stafford Beer.

=== Biology ===
The influence of Autopoiesis in mainstream biology was limited. Autopoiesis is not commonly used as the criterion for life. However, its basic principles are seen as features of the functions of biological organisms. Sir Paul Nurse, for example states 'living entities ... construct their own metabolism, and use it to maintain themselves, grow, and reproduce'.
