= Julie Tetel Andresen =

American linguistic historiographer

- Born: 1950 (age 75–76); Chicago, Illinois, U.S.
- Education: Duke University; University of North Carolina at Chapel Hill (PhD)
- Occupations: Linguistic historiographer; novelist
- Writing career
- Genre: Romance
- Website: julietetelandresen.com

Julie Tetel Andresen (born 1950) is an American linguistic historiographer and romance novelist who is a professor at Duke University, where she has taught since 1986. Her primary appointment is in the Department of English. She has secondary appointments in the Departments of Cultural Anthropology and Slavic and Eurasian Studies. She is chair of the Interdepartmental Program in Linguistics.

== Early life and education ==
Andresen was born in Chicago, Illinois and earned her undergraduate degree at Duke in 1972. Her master's degree was in French literature, through which she discovered phonetics and, in turn, linguistics. She received her Ph.D. in Linguistics from the University of North Carolina Chapel Hill in 1980. Her dissertation was “Linguistic Crossroads of the Eighteenth Century.”

== Career ==
=== Academic career ===
Andresen began her academic career as a linguistic historiographer. Over the years she widened her research to investigate human language from the perspectives of autopoiesis, behaviorism, cultural anthropology, developmental systems theory, evolutionary biology, gender studies, neurobiology, philosophy, political theory, primatology, and psychology. She is known for her approach to synthesizing the latest research in the social and biological sciences, and its contribution to linguistic theory.

=== Romance novels ===
While working on her Ph.D., Andresen read her first romance novel, a book by Georgette Heyer. This experience inspired her to pick up writing. Andresen published her first fiction novel in 1985. She mainly writes within the genres of romance and historical fiction. During her fiction writing career, she has published 30 historical and contemporary novels for mass market and independent publishers including Harlequin Enterprises, Fawcett Publications, Madeira Books, and Amazon.

In 1997, Andresen founded a publishing company. It goes by the name of Generation Books for non-fiction works and Madeira Books for fiction works.

When asked about connecting her academic career to that of her novels, Andresen has said "I don’t see the two activities – high-minded scholarship and romance writing – as being at odds." She has said that she would not write a character whose native language she herself does not know, and when she does use foreign language in her writing, she checks her work with native speakers.

== Personal life ==
Andresen speaks English, French, Romanian and German. In addition, she has spent time learning Mongolian, Vietnamese, and other languages.

== Awards and honours ==
- Senior Researcher, University of Bucharest, Romania, Fulbright Grant, 2005–2006, lecturing in Social and Political Issues in American Language Studies, Past and Present

== Academic publications ==
=== Books ===
- Languages in the World. How History, Culture and Politics Shape Language, with Phillip M. Carter. Wiley-Blackwell (2016)
- Linguistics and Evolution. A Developmental Approach. Cambridge University Press (2014)
- Linguistics in America 1769-1924: A Critical History. Routledge (1990, 1995)

=== Articles ===
- “Historiography’s contribution to theoretical linguistics.” In Chomskyan Evolutions and Revolutions: Essays in Honor of E.F.K. Koerner, ed. D. Kibbee. John Benjamins (2010)
- “Pragmatism, Behaviorism, and the Evolutionary Script.” C.S. Peirce Papers (1998)
- "Postmodern Identity (Crisis): Confessions of a Linguistic Historiographer and Romance Writer." Romantic Conventions, eds. A. Kaler and R. Johnson-Kurek. Bowling Green State University Press (1998)
- "L'école américaine." Histoire des idées linguistiques 3, ed. S. Auroux (1998)
- "The Contemporary Linguist Meets the Postmodernist." Beitrage zur Geschichte der Sprachwissenschaft 2 (1992)
- "The Behaviorist Turn in Recent Theories about Language." Behavior and Philosophy 20.1 (1992)
- "Whitney und Bloomfield: Abweichungen und Ubereinstimmungen." History and Historiography of Linguistics, eds. H. Niederehe and K. Koerner. John Benjamins (1990) ("Whitney and Bloomfield on American English" in ERIC Clearinghouse on Languages and Linguistics. Center for Applied Linguistics. Center for Applied Linguistics. Washington, D.C. ERIC Document Reproduction Service No.: ED 291 239. English version of German paper)
- "Skinner and Chomsky Thirty Years Later." Historiographia Linguistica 17. 1/2 (1990) (Reprinted in The Behavior Analyst 1.14:49-60. 1991)
- "The Ideologues, Condillac and the Politics of Sign Theory." Semiotica 72.3/4 (1988)
- "Historiographic Observations on a Current Issue in American Linguistics." Papers in the History of Linguistics, eds. H. Aarsleff, H. Niederehe, L.G. Kelly, 647–56. John Benjamins (1987)
- "Images des langues américaines au XVIIIe siècle." L'homme des Lumières et la découverte de l'autre, eds. P. Gossiaux and D. Droixhe. University of Brussels (1985)
- "Why Do We Do Linguistic Historiography?" Semiotica 56.3/4 (1985)
- "Les langues amérindiennes, le comparatisme et les études franco-américaines." Amerindia 6 (1984)
- "Débris et histoire dans la théorie linguistique au XVIII siècle." Matériaux pour une histoire des théories linguistiques, eds. S. Auroux, M. Glatigny, A. Joly, et al. Presses Universitaires de Lille (1984)
- "Arbitraire et Contingence in the Semiotics of the Eighteenth Century." Semiotica 49.3/4 (1984)
- "Signs and Systems in Condillac and Saussure." Semiotica 44.3.4 (1983)
- "Langage naturel et artifice linguistique." Condillac et les problèmes du language, ed. J. Sgard. Geneva: Slatkine (1982)
- "Linguistic Metaphors in Charles de Brosses' Traité of 1765 and the History Linguistics." Linguisticae Investigationes I (1981)
- "From Condillac to Condorcet: The Algebra of History. Studies in the History of Linguistics 20, ed. E.F.K. Koerner. John Benjamins (1980)
- "François Thurot and the First History of Grammar." Historiographia Linguistica V.1/2 (1978)

== Fiction publications ==
- Love After All (2016)
- Knocked Out (2015)
- Captured (2014)
- Tied Up (2013)
- DeMarco's Café (2012)
- French Lessons (2012)
- Drawn to Love (2011)
- The Emerald Hour (2011)
- The Crimson Hour (2004)
- The Blue Hour (1998)
- Heart's Wilderness (1997)
- Carolina Sonnet (1995)
- MacLaurin's Lady (1995)
- The Handfast (1994)
- Simon's Lady (1994)
- Dawn's Early Light (1993)
- Unexpected Company (1993)
- The Temporary Bride (1993)
- Suspicious Hearts (1992)
- And Heaven Too (1990)
- Swept Away (1989)
- Tangled Dreams (1989)
- Catherine of York (1987)
- Lord Laxton's Will (1985)
- My Lord Roland (1985)
