= Poiesis =

Concept in semiotics

In continental philosophy and semiotics, poiesis (/pɔɪˈiːsɪs/; from Ancient Greek: ποίησις) is the process of emergence of something that did not previously exist. Forms of poiesis—including autopoiesis, the process of sustenance through the emergence of sustaining parts—are considered in philosophy and semiotics to be the foundation of activity, alongside semiosis which is considered the foundation of the production of meaning.

== Etymology ==
Poiesis is etymologically derived from the ancient Greek term ποιεῖν, which means "to make". It is related to the word poetry, which shares the same root. The word is also used as a suffix, as in the biological term hematopoiesis (the formation of blood cells) and erythropoiesis (the formation of red blood cells).

== Overview ==
Heidegger referred to poiesis as a "bringing-forth", or physis as emergence. Examples of physis are the blooming of the blossom, the coming-out of a butterfly from a cocoon, and the plummeting of a waterfall when the snow begins to melt; the last two analogies underline Heidegger's example of a threshold occasion, a moment of ecstasis when something moves away from its standing as one thing to become another. These examples may also be understood as the unfolding of a thing out of itself; as being discloses or gathers from nothing, thus nothing is thought also as being. Plato's Symposium and Timaeus have been analyzed by modern scholars in this vein of interpretation.

=== Meta-poiesis ===
In their 2011 book, All Things Shining, Hubert Dreyfus and Sean Dorrance Kelly argue that embracing a "meta-poietic" mindset is the best, if not the only, method to authenticate meaning in the secular era:

Meta-poiesis, as one might call it, steers between the twin dangers of the secular age: it resists nihilism by reappropriating the sacred phenomenon of physis, but cultivates the skill to resist physis in its abhorrent, fanatical form. Living well in our secular, nihilistic age, therefore, requires the higher-order skill of recognizing when to rise up as one with the ecstatic crowd and when to turn heel and walk rapidly away.

Furthermore, Dreyfus and Dorrance Kelly urge each person to become a sort of "craftsman" whose responsibility it is to refine their faculty for poiesis in order to achieve existential meaning in their lives and to reconcile their bodies with whatever transcendence there is to be had in life itself: "The task of the craftsman is not to generate the meaning, but rather to cultivate in himself the skill for discerning the meanings that are already there."

== See also ==
- Allopoiesis, a process whereby a system can create something other than itself
- Esthesic and poietic – Terms used in the study of signs
- Self-organization – Process of forming order by local interactions
- Causa sui – Term that denotes something that is generated within itself
- Complex systems – System composed of many interacting components
- Always already – Philosophical term
