= Structure–organization–process =

In The Tree of Knowledge (1987), Humberto Maturana and Francisco Varela set out a way of describing the nature of living things: “… [An] organization denotes those relations that must exist among components of a system for it to be a member of a specific class. Structure denotes the components and relations that actually constitute a particular unity [or thing]…” While Maturana and Varela (1987) do not pursue a specific discussion about process, they set out to understand the role of cognition as “… the universal nature of doing”. Maturana and Varela are seeking to understand what they term autopoiesis, how living things self–produce. Maturana and Varela (1987) claim: “… by realizing what characterizes living beings in their autopoietic organization, we can unify a whole lot of empirical data about their biochemistry and cellular functioning”.

In this description we find that structure refers to the component parts that comprise something and organizations refers to the way these parts are assembled (organized). In this way all real things can be described as having an organized structure. The term system can also be used for an organized structure. This idea forms the basis of Maturana and Varela’s idea of autopoiesis (self-production).

== Capra ==
In The Web of Life, Fritjof Capra (1996) synthesized the systems theory literature and, in particular, Maturana and Varela’s contribution, by setting out three criteria for a living system — the pattern of organization, the structure and the life process:

- Pattern of organization is the configuration of relationships that determines the systems essential characteristics (Autopoiesis as defined by Maturana and Varela, 1987).
- Structure is the physical embodiment of the system’s pattern of organization (Dissipative structures as defined by Prigogine and Stengers, 1987).
- Life process is the activity involved in the continual embodiment of the system’s pattern of organization. (Cognition as defined by Gregory Bateson, 1979).

While Capra concentrates his discussion on living things, the idea behind the concept of structure–organization–process is one in which a process [self] organizes [its own] structure (autopoieses as defined by Maturana and Varela, 1987). As we can see, the definitions for these three elements are a little confusing. This is why the idea of structure–organization–process (SOP) has been applied more generally by Linda Glassop (2007).

== Levels ==
At the level of a real thing, SOP describes:

- Structure refers to the attributes distinguishing something (trait, value, shape and efficacy).
- Organization refers to parts that comprise something: the properties (evident by valued traits), and their relationship (evident by their shape and efficacy).
- Process refers to the constitution of parts (the bundle of related properties) that produces a whole thing.

In the ontological literature, SOP describes:

- Structure refers closed systems (or the attributes of the universe that are independent).
- Organization refers to open systems (or the parts of the universe that depend on closed systems).
- Process refers to social systems (or the wholes that are inter–dependent on closed and open systems that make up eco–systems, e.g., the universe).

In the metaphysics literature, SOP describes:

- Structure refers to individual things.
- Organization refers to categories of things (clusters of individuals, where a part is a category).
- Process refers to universal things (all things, e.g., parts as the set).

== SOP model ==
The SOP model described by Glassop (2007) opens up a way of looking at anything by considering:

1. what the thing is composed of (the structures that distinguish it),
2. how the thing is composed (the organization of the parts), and
3. that a whole thing is an organized structure (the process of comprising the parts).

What we see in this description is that real things are multi–faceted and that each level needs to be considered separate and together. Glassop has utilized this framework to provide a theoretical description for the Periodic Table of Elements and the key features of DNA.

== See also ==
- Social structure
- Structure and agency
- Complexity theory and organizations
- Social change
- Negarchy
- Ideology
- Autopoiesis
