= Lowerarchy =

Lowerarchy may refer to:

- A concept in systems theory: Lowerarchy;
- The organization of evil demons in C. S. Lewis' series of stories titles The Screwtape Letters.
