= Das falsche Buch =

1983 novel by Paul Wühr

- Cover of an early edition
- Author: Paul Wühr
- Language: German
- Genre: Novel
- Publisher: Hanser
- Publication date: 1983
- Publication place: Germany
- Media type: Print (Hardback & Paperback)
- Pages: 722 pp
- ISBN: 3-446-13846-3
- OCLC: 10418899
- Dewey Decimal: 833/.914 19
- LC Class: PT2685.U25 F3 1983

Das falsche Buch (The False Book) is a 1983 German novel by Paul Wühr. He began writing it in 1970.

== Allusions/references to actual history, geography and current science ==
Several of the characters are based upon true figures such as German sociologist Niklas Luhmann, Ulrich Sonnemann, Johann Georg Hamann and United States inventor Richard Buckminster Fuller.

== Awards and nominations ==
It won the Bremen Literary Award in 1984.
