= Differentiation (sociology) =

Increase in subsystems within a modern society

In system theory, differentiation is the tendency of subsystems in a modern society to increase the society's complexity. Each subsystem can make different connections with other subsystems, and this leads to more variation within the system in order to respond to variation in the environment.

Differentiation that leads to more variation allows for better responses to the environment, and also for faster evolution—or perhaps sociocultural evolution—which is defined sociologically as a process of selection from variation. The more differentiation (and thus variation) that is available, the better the selection.

== Introduction ==
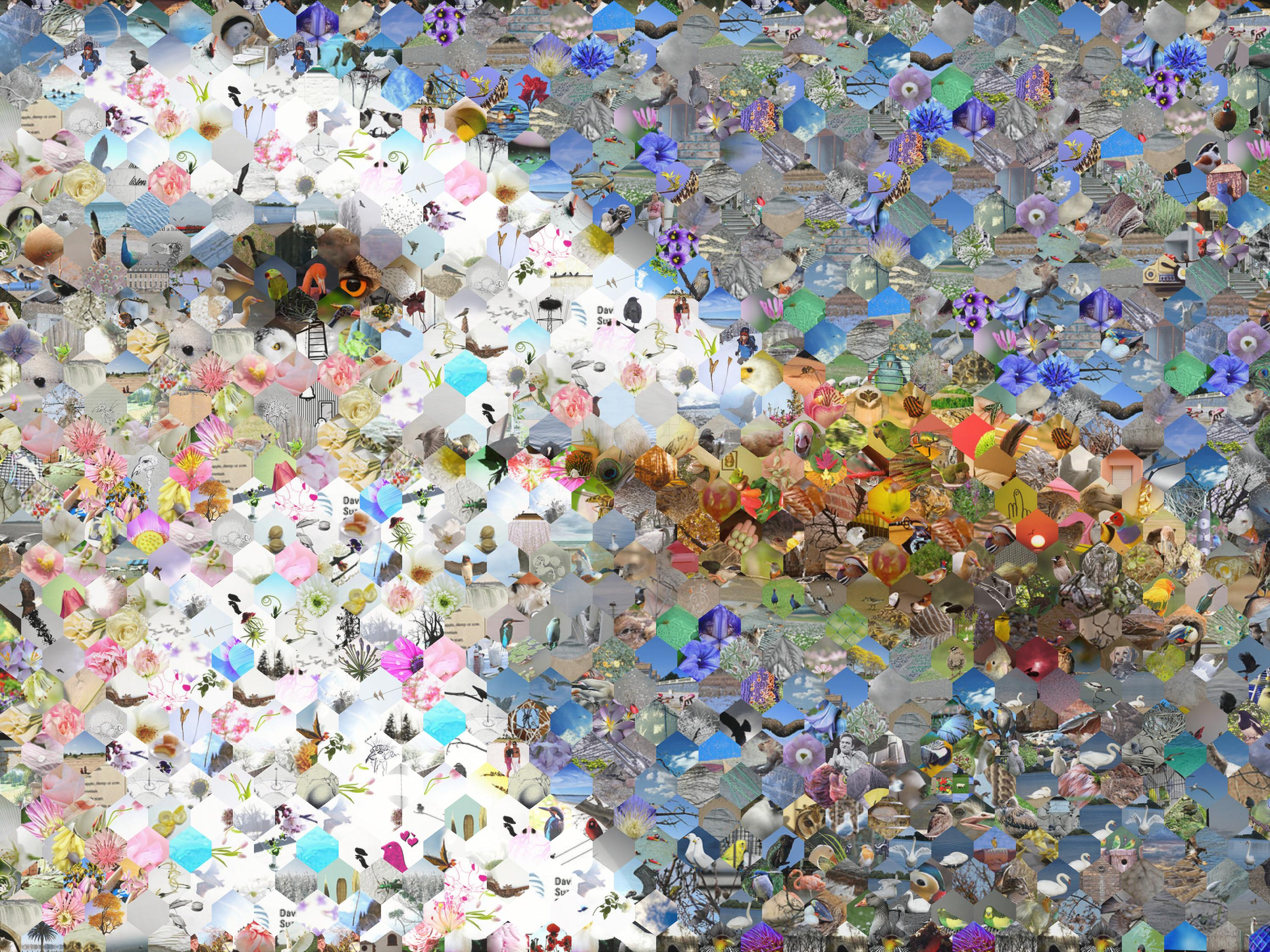
Exemplifying Differentiation and System Theory, this photographic mosaic may be perceived as a whole/system (a gull) or as a less complex group of parts.

Talcott Parsons was the first major theorist to develop a theory of society consisting of functionally defined sub-systems, which emerges from an evolutionary point of view through a cybernetic process of differentiation. Parsons regarded society as the combined activities of its subsystems within the logic of a cybernetic hierarchy.

For Parsons, although each subsystem would tend to have self-referential tendencies and follow a related path of structural differentiation, it would occur in a constant interpenetrative communication with the other subsystems. The historical equilibrium between the interpenetrative balance between various subsystems would determine the relative degree to which the structural differentiation between subsystem would or would not occur.

Niklas Luhmann, who studied under Parsons, took the latter's model and changed it significantly. In contrast to Luhmann, Parsons highlighted that—although each subsystem had self-referential capacities and an internal logic of its own (ultimately located in each system's pattern maintenance)—in historical reality, the actual interaction, communication, and mutual enabledness between the subsystems was crucial not only for each of them but also for the overall development of the social system and/or "society".

Parsons maintained that the relative historical strength of various subsystems, including the interpenetrative equilibrium of each subsystem's subsystems, could either block or promote the forces of system differentiation. He believed the main "gatekeeper" blocking-promoting question was to be found in the cultural system's historical codification, including "cultural traditions". These he regarded in general as a part of the so-called "fiduciary system", which facilitates the normatively defining epicenter of the communication and historical mode of institutionalisation between cultural and social system. For example, the various ways Islam has been transferred as a cultural pattern into various social systems depend on the particular way in which the core Islamic value-symbols have been codified within each particular fiduciary system—again depending on a series of various societal and history-related factors.

Parsons maintained that in the course of the general rationalisation process of the world and the related secularisation process, the value-scheme structure of the religious and "magic" systems would be "transformed" stepwise into political ideologies, market doctrines, folklore systems, social lifestyles and aesthetic movements, and so on. This transformation, Parsons maintained, was not so much the destruction of the religious value schemes (although such a process could also occur) but was generally the way in which "religious" (and in a broader sense, "constitutive") values would tend to move from a religious-magic and primordial "representation" to one more secularised and "modern" in its institutionalised and symbolistic expression. This again would coincide with the increasing relative independence of systems of expressive symbolization vis a vis cognitive and evaluative lines of differentiation; for example, the flower power movement in the 1960s and early 1970s.

The breakthrough of rock music in the 1950s and the sensual expressiveness of Elvis Presley would be another example of the way in which expressive symbolisation would tend to increase its impact vis a vis other factors of system differentiation. This again, according to Parsons, was a part of the deeper evolutionary logic, related in part to the increased impact of the goal-attachment function of the cultural system and at the same time related to the increased factor of institutionalised individualism, which have become a fundamental feature for historical modernity.

Luhmann tended to claim that each subsystem has autopoietic "drives" of its own. Instead of reducing society as a whole to one of its subsystems, such as Karl Marx did to economics or Hans Kelsen did to law, Luhmann based his analysis on the idea that society is a self-differentiating system that will, in order to attain mastery over an environment that is always more complex than itself, increase its own complexity through a proliferating of subsystems. Although Luhmann claimed that society could not be reduced to any one of its subsystems, his critics maintain that his autopoietic assumptions make it impossible to "constitute" a society at all, and that his theory is inherently self-contradictory. "Religion" is more extensive than the church; "politics" transcends the governmental apparatus; and "economics" encompasses more than the sum total of organizations of production.

== Differentiation basics ==
=== Types of differentiation ===
==== Segmentary differentiation ====
Segmentary differentiation divides parts of the system on the basis of the need to fulfil identical functions over and over. For instance, a car manufacturer may have functionally similar factories for the production of cars at many different locations. Every location is organized in much the same way; each has the same structure and fulfils the same function: producing cars.

==== Stratifactory differentiation ====
Stratificatory differentiation or social stratification is a vertical differentiation according to rank or status in a system conceived as a hierarchy. Every rank fulfills a particular and distinct function in the system; for instance, the manufacturing company president, the plant manager, trickling down to the assembly-line worker. In segmentary differentiation, although inequality is an accidental variance and serves no essential function, inequality is systemic in the function of stratified systems.

A stratified system is more concerned with the higher ranks (president, manager) than with the lower ranks (assembly-line worker) with regard to "influential communication". However, the ranks are dependent on each other and the social system will collapse unless all ranks carry out their functions. This type of system tends to necessitate that the lower ranks initiate conflict in order to shift the influential communication to their level.

==== Center-periphery differentiation ====
Center-periphery differentiation is a link between segmentary and stratificatory. An example is again the automobile firm. Although it may have built factories in other countries, nevertheless its headquarters remains the center that rules and, to whatever extent, controls the peripheral factories.

==== Functional differentiation ====
Functional differentiation is predominate in modern society and is also the most complex form of differentiation. All functions within a system become ascribed to a particular unit or site. Again, citing the automobile firm as an example, it may be "functionally differentiated" departmentally, having a production department, administration, accounting, planning, personnel, etc.

Functional differentiation tends to be more flexible than stratifactory, but just as a stratified system is dependent on all rank, in a functional system if one part fails to fulfill its task, the whole system will have great difficulty surviving. However, as long as each unit is able to fulfill its separate function, the differentiated units become largely independent. Functionally differentiated systems are a complex mixture of interdependence and independence; for example, the planning division may be dependent on the accounting division for economic data, but so long as the data is accurately compiled, the planning division can be ignorant of the methodology involved to collect the data, interdependence yet independence.

=== Code ===
Code is a way to distinguish elements within a system from those elements that do not belong to that system. It is the basic language of a functional system. Examples include truth for the science system, payment for the economic system, and legality for the legal system. The purpose of code is to limit the kinds of permissible communication. According to Luhmann, a system will understand and use only its own code, and will not understand or use the code of another system. Because the systems are closed and can react to elements only within their environment, there is no way to import the code of one system into another .

=== Risk of complexity ===
It is exemplified that in segmentary differentiation, if a segment fails to fulfill its function it does not affect or threaten the larger system. If an auto plant in Michigan stops production, this does not threaten the overall system or the plants in other locations. However, as complexity increases, so does the risk of system breakdown. If a rank structure in a stratified system fails, it threatens the system; a center-periphery system might be threatened if the control measure, or the center/headquarters failed; and in a functionally differentiated system, due to the existence of interdependence despite independence, the failure of one unit will cause a problem for the social system, possibly leading to its breakdown. The growth of complexity increases a system's abilities to deal with its environment, but it also increases the risk of system breakdown.

More complex systems do not necessarily exclude less complex ones, and that sometimes more complex systems may require the existence of less complex ones to function.

== Luhmann's contributions ==
=== Definition of society ===
Luhmann uses the operative distinction between system and environment to determine that society is a complex system that replicates the system/environment distinction to form internal subsystems. Among these internally differentiated social systems is science, and within this system is the subsystem sociology. Here, in the system sociology, Luhmann finds himself again an observer observing society. His knowledge of society as an internally differentiated system is a contingent observation made from within one of the specialised function-systems he observes. He concludes, therefore, that any social theory claiming universal status must take this contingency into account.

Once one uses the basic system/environment distinction, none of the traditional philosophical or sociological distinctions—transcendental and empirical, subject and object, ideology, and science—can eliminate the contingency of enforced selectivity. Thus, Luhmann's theory of social systems breaks with not only all forms of transcendentalism but also the philosophy of history.

Luhmann is criticised as being self-referential and repetitive because a system is forced to observe society from within society. Systems theory, for its part, unfolds this paradox with the notion that the observer observes society from within a subsystem (in this case: sociology) of a subsystem (science) of the social system. Its descriptions are thus "society of society".

=== Critique of political and economic theories of society ===
Luhmann felt that a society that thematised itself as political society misunderstood itself, as it was simply a social system in which a newly differentiated political subsystem had functional primacy. Luhmann analysed the Marxist approach to an economy based society: In this theory, the concept of economic society is understood to denote a new type of society in which production, and beyond that "a metabolically founded system of needs", replaces politics as the central social process. From another perspective also characteristic of Marxist thought, the term "bourgeois society" is meant to signify that a politically defined ruling segment is now replaced as the dominant stratum by the owners of property.

Luhmann's reservations concerning not only Marxist but also bourgeois theories of economic society parallel his criticisms of Aristotelian political philosophy as a theory of political society. Both theories make the understandable error of "pars pro toto"—taking the part for the whole—which in this context means identifying a social subsystem with the whole of society. The error can be traced to the dramatic nature of the emergence of each subsystem and its functional primacy, for a time, in relation to the other spheres of society.

Nevertheless, the functional primacy claimed for the economy should not have led to asserting an economic permeation of all spheres of life. The notion of the economy as possessing functional primacy is compatible with the well-known idea that the political subsystem not only grew increasingly differentiated from religion, morals, and customs, if not from the economy, but also continued to increase in size and internal complexity over the course of the entire capitalist epoch. For functional primacy need only imply that the internal complexity of a given subsystem is the greatest, and that the new developmental stage of society is characterised by tasks and problems originating primarily in this sphere.
