= Enantiostasis =

Enantiostasis is the ability of an open system, especially a living organism, to maintain and conserve its metabolic and physiological functions in response to variations in an unstable environment. Estuarine organisms typically undergo enantiostasis in order to survive with constantly changing salt concentrations. The Australian NSW Board of Studies defines the term in its Biology syllabus as "the maintenance of metabolic and physiological functions in response to variations in the environment".

Enantiostasis is not a form of classical homeostasis, meaning "standing at a similar level," which focuses on maintenance of internal body conditions such as pH, oxygen levels, and ion concentrations. Rather than maintaining homeostatic (stable ideal) conditions, enantiostasis involves maintaining only functionality in spite of external fluctuations. However, it can be considered a type of homeostasis in a broader context because functions are kept relatively consistent. Organic compounds such as Taurine have been shown to still properly function within environments that have been disrupted from an ideal state.

The term enantiostasis was proposed by Mangum and Towle. It is derived from the Greek ἐναντίος (enantio-; opposite, opposing, over against) and στάσις (stasis; to stand, posture).

== Trehalose ==
- Fruit flies (Drosophila) use the non-toxic sugar trehalose that is found in the hemolymph of insects to cope with changes in environmental conditions. Trehalose levels can spike up to 2% in the hemolymph in response to temperature changes, salinity and osmotic and oxidative stress.
- Yeast cells accumulate trehalose in order to withstand heat stress.

== Estuarine environments ==
Examples of organisms which undergo enantiostasis in an estuarine environment include:

- The oxygen binding effectiveness of hemocyanin in the blue crab Callinectes sapidus varies according to the concentration of two factors, calcium ion concentration, and hydrogen ion concentration. When these concentrations are varied in the same direction, they have a counterbalancing effect. To stabilize oxygen binding at low ionic concentrations, the crab increases its internal pH (decreasing the hydrogen ion concentration) to allow the hemocyanin to continue to function efficiently.
- The Dungeness crab, Cancer magister, relies on the magnesium ion (Mg^{2+}) for its hemocyanin oxygen affinity. In the juvenile stage, the crab has higher magnesium ion concentrations resulting in higher hemocyanin oxygen affinity. This changes throughout development, such that the adult Cancer magister has less magnesium ion and thus, less hemocyanin oxygen affinity. Intrinsic oxygen affinity is inversely proportional magnesium ion concentrations in the crab, which counterbalances the hemocyanin oxygen affinity.

== High-salt environments ==
- Halophiles have adapted to high salt environments by using energy from the sun to maintain a high internal potassium ion concentration and by using biological proteins that can function in the varying, high internal potassium ion concentrations. These adaptions allow halophiles to thrive by increasing internal osmolarity to compensate for the high sodium concentrations of the external environment, which prevents the movement of water out of the cell.
