= Paul Wühr =

German writer

Paul Wühr (10 July 1927 – 12 July 2016) was a German experimental author. Wühr lived by Lake Trasimeno in Umbria, Italy and wrote for the publisher Hanser-Verlag.

== Selected works ==
=== Novels ===
- Gegenmünchen, 1970
- Das falsche Buch, 1983
- Der faule Strick, 1987
- Wenn man mich so reden hört, 1993
- Luftstreiche, 1994
- Was ich noch vergessen habe, 2002

=== Poems ===
- Grüß Gott ihr Mütter ihr Väter ihr Töchter ihr Söhne, 1976
- Rede, 1979
- Sage, 1988
- Salve Res Publica Poetica, 1997
- Venus im Pudel, 2000

=== Radio plays ===
- Das Experiment, 1963
- Wer kann mir sagen, wer Sheila ist?, 1964
- Die Rechnung, 1965
- Fensterstürze, 1968
- Preislied, 1971
- Soundseeing Metropolis München, 1986
- Faschang Garaus, 1988

=== Textbooks ===
- So spricht unsereiner, 1973 (contains texts for the radio plays Preislied, So eine Freiheit, Trip Null, Verirrhaus)

=== Plays ===
- Pyramus und Thisbe, 1986

== Awards and prizes ==
- 1971 – Hörspielpreis der Kriegsblinden
- 1984 – Literaturpreis der Stadt Bremen (for his novel Das falsche Buch)
- 1990 – Petrarca-Preis
- 1997 – Großer Literaturpreis der Bayerischen Akademie der Schönen Künste
- 2002 – Hans-Erich-Nossack-Preis.
