= George Thomson Chapman =

George Thomson Chapman (14 June 1824–24 June 1881) was a New Zealand merchant, bookseller and publisher . He was born in Stonehaven, Kincardineshire, Scotland on 14 June 1824.

== Select bibliography ==
=== Maps ===
- Chapman's map of the Waikato with Raglan, Kawhia and Tauranga districts by J. Wareham (1866)
- Chapman's Map of the North Island of New Zealand including the Provinces of Auckland, Taranaki, Hawke's Bay, and Wellington with all the recent surveys(1866)
