= George L. Chapman =

Australian rules footballer, born 1909

George Chapman

Personal information
- Full name: George Chapman
- Born: 28 February 1909
- Died: 13 October 2003 (aged 94)
- Original team: Oakleigh
- Height: 174 cm (5 ft 9 in)
- Weight: 66 kg (146 lb)

Playing career^{1}
| Years | Club | Games (Goals) |
| 1932 | Fitzroy | 13 (9) |
| 1933 | St Kilda | 4 (6) |
| Total | | 17 (15) |
- ^{1} Playing statistics correct to the end of 1933.

George Chapman (28 February 1909 – 13 October 2003) was an Australian rules footballer who played with Fitzroy and St Kilda in the Victorian Football League (VFL).

Chapman began his senior football career with Oakleigh in the Victorian Football Association (VFA) in 1929. During his early years at Oakleigh, the club was coached by former Essendon player Frank Maher, who led Oakleigh to consecutive VFA premierships in 1930 and 1931.

During the 1931 VFA season, Chapman played against Preston captain-coach Roy Cazaly, one of the most prominent figures in Australian football history. In their Round 7 meeting, Chapman played at half-forward and kicked two goals as Oakleigh defeated Preston, while Cazaly kicked one goal for Preston. The pair again opposed each other in the 1931 second semi-final between Oakleigh and Preston. Cazaly's name was later immortalised in the Australian football catch cry "Up there, Cazaly!", and subsequently in the 1979 song Up There Cazaly, written by Mike Brady to promote televised VFL football. The catch cry had also entered Australian popular culture well before the song, and was used by Australian servicemen as a battle cry during the Second World War. The song became an unofficial anthem of Australian rules football and continues to be associated with AFL Grand Final celebrations.

When Maher left Oakleigh to become coach of Fitzroy for the 1932 VFL season, Chapman also moved from Oakleigh to Fitzroy. He played 13 games and kicked nine goals for Fitzroy that season. On 9 July 1932, Chapman kicked two goals against Melbourne at the Melbourne Cricket Ground (MCG) and received two Brownlow Medal votes, with teammate Haydn Bunton receiving three votes.

Chapman subsequently moved to St Kilda in 1933. According to family accounts, he had wanted to join St Kilda but Fitzroy initially refused to clear him, delaying his move. He made his St Kilda debut against North Melbourne on 27 May 1933. The match became one of the notable games in St Kilda's history. After a succession of injuries, St Kilda was reduced to 15 players but nevertheless defeated North Melbourne by 14 points. Contemporary reports named Chapman among St Kilda's better players.

Chapman played four games and kicked six goals for St Kilda in 1933 before returning to Oakleigh. According to Chapman's son, Edwin Lee Chapman, St Kilda paid Chapman 10 shillings per match, while Oakleigh offered £2 per match in an effort to entice him back, four times as much, and Chapman used his football earnings to help pay off his house. His son also recalled that Chapman's playing career ended after he suffered a broken leg in 1937. Chapman ultimately played 90 senior VFA games and kicked 52 goals for Oakleigh between 1929 and 1936.

In 2003, seventy years after the 15-man victory over North Melbourne, Chapman's son, Edwin Lee Chapman, contacted St Kilda regarding the historical significance of the match and suggested that the club invite his father to attend a match commemorating the anniversary of the historic victory. At the time, George Chapman was still alive at the age of 94, while records confirm that many of the players from the 1933 match had long since died. Despite Chapman having been a member of the celebrated side, he was not invited by the club. Chapman died later that year, on 13 October 2003.
