= George Chapman (footballer, born 1920) =

English footballer

Personal information
- Date of birth: 8 October 1920
- Place of birth: Linton, Derbyshire, England
- Date of death: April 1998 (aged 77)
- Place of death: England
- Height: 5 ft 9 in (1.75 m)
- Position: Inside left

Senior career*
Years	Team	Apps	(Gls)
–	West Bromwich Albion	0	(0)
1946–1948	Brighton & Hove Albion	43	(12)
1948–19??	Tonbridge		
- * Club domestic league appearances and goals

George W. Chapman (8 October 1920 – April 1998) is an English former professional footballer who scored 12 goals from 43 appearances in the Football League playing for Brighton & Hove Albion. Born in Linton, Derbyshire, he began his career with West Bromwich Albion, but played only matches in the wartime competitions for that club, never in the League. He was Brighton's top scorer in the 1946–47 season with 10 goals in all competitions. Chapman played as an inside left.
