= Dieter Claessens =

German sociologist and anthropologist

Dieter Claessens (2 August 1921, Berlin – 30 March 1997, Berlin) was a German sociologist and anthropologist.

== Life ==
Returning as a POW from the Soviet Union, Dieter Claessens studied sociology, anthropology, and psychology in Berlin, where he got his doctorate from the Freie Universität in 1957. He took his sociological post-doctoral degree (habilitation) from the University of Münster, where he was called to a Chair of Sociology in 1962. 1966 he returned as professor to the Free University, and retired there in 1986, continuing his research work until his death in Berlin in 1997.

He got his reputation especially for his pioneering work on the sociological dimension of both ontogenesis and phylogenesis.

== Publications ==
- Status als entwicklungssoziologischer Begriff, 1965
- (with Arno Klönne, Armin Tschoepe) Sozialkunde der Bundesrepublik Deutschland, 1965 (many editions)
- Instinkt, Psyche, Geltung. Bestimmungsfaktoren menschlichen Verhaltens, 1966 (2. ed. 1970)
- Familie und Wertsystem. Eine Studie zur zweiten sozio-kulturellen Geburt des Menschen, 1968 (4. ed. 1978, his basic study on ontogeny)
- Rolle und Macht, 1968 (3. ed. 1974)
- Nova Natura. Anthropologische Grundlagen des modernen Denkens, 1970
- (with Karin Claessens) Kapitalismus als Kultur. Entstehung und Grundlagen der bürgerlichen Gesellschaft, 1973
- (with Karin Claessens, Baruta Schaller) Jugendlexikon, 1976
- Gruppen und Gruppenverbände. Systematische Einführung in die Folgen der Vergesellschaftung, 1977
- Das Konkrete und das Abstrakte, 1980 (his basic study on phylogenesis)
- (with Wanda von Baeyer-Katte) Gruppenprozesse. Analysen zum Terrorismus, 1982
- (with Rainer Mackensen, eds.): Universalism Today, Contributions at the IInd International Symposium for Universalism (Berlin, August 22 to 26th, 1990), 1992, ISBN 3-7983-1472-1 & ISBN 978-3-7983-1472-6
- (with Daniel Tyradellis) Konkrete Soziologie. Verständliche Einführung in soziologisches Denken, 1997
