= Humberto Maturana =

Chilean biologist and philosopher (1928–2021)

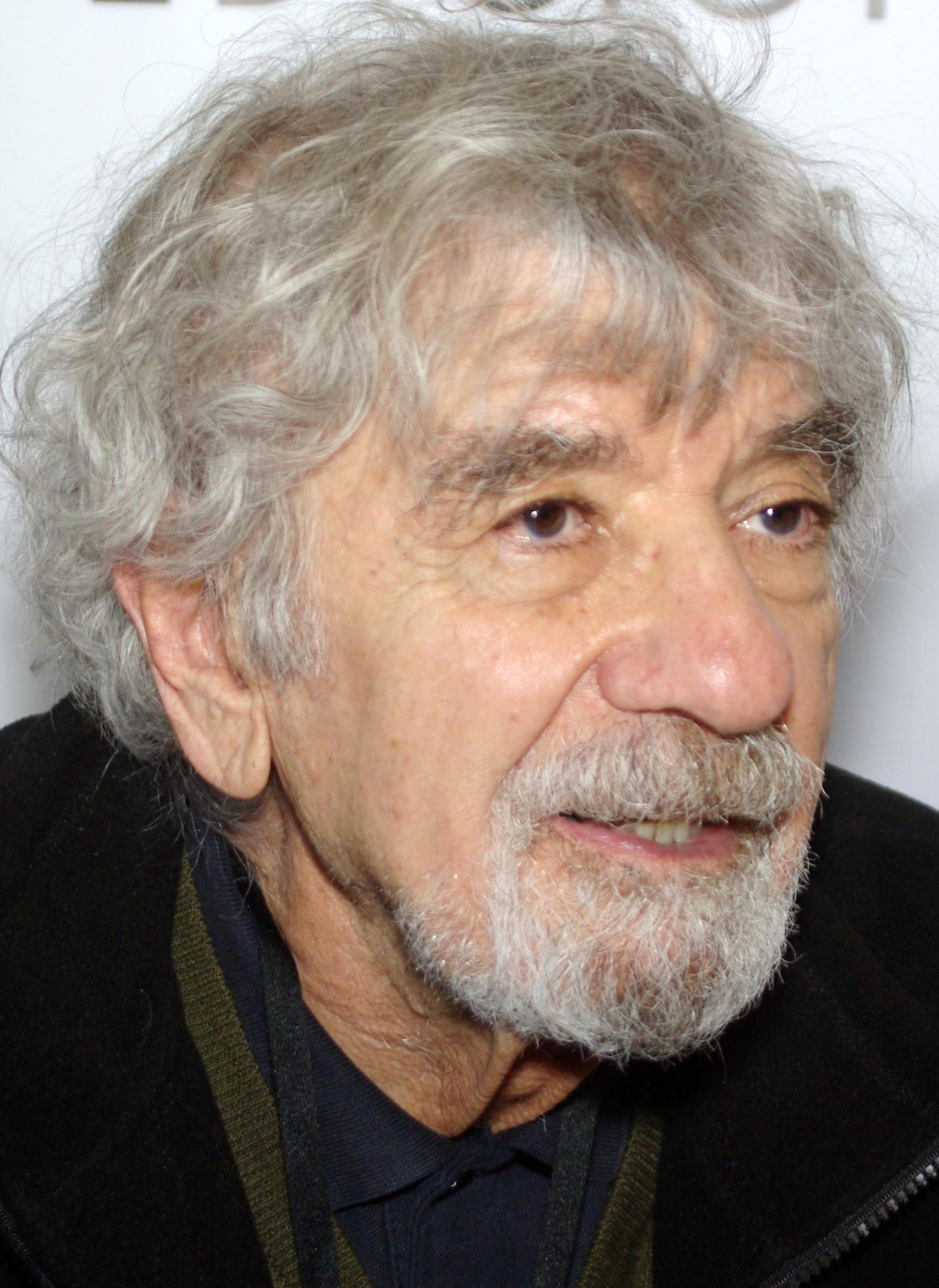
- Maturana in 2015
- Born: September 14, 1928; Santiago, Chile
- Died: May 6, 2021 (aged 92); Santiago, Chile
- Education: University of Chile; University College London; Harvard University
- Awards: National Prize for Natural Sciences
- Scientific career
- Fields: Biology, philosophy
- Workplaces: University of Chile; Instituto de Formación Matríztica
- Thesis: The fine structure of the optic nerve and tectum of anurans; an electron microscope study (1959)
- Doctoral advisor: George B. Chapman
- Doctoral students: Rafael E. Núñez; Francisco Varela

Humberto Maturana Romesín (September 14, 1928 – May 6, 2021) was a Chilean biologist and philosopher. Some name him a second-order cybernetics theoretician alongside the likes of Heinz von Foerster, Gordon Pask, Herbert Brün and Ernst von Glasersfeld.

Maturana, along with Francisco Varela and Ricardo B. Uribe, was known for creating the term "autopoiesis" about the self-generating, self-maintaining structure in living systems, and concepts such as structural determinism and structural coupling. His work was influential in many fields, mainly the field of systems thinking and cybernetics. Overall, his work is concerned with the biology of cognition. Maturana (2002) insisted that autopoiesis exists only in the molecular domain, and he did not agree with the extension into sociology and other fields:

The molecular domain is the only domain of entities that through their interactions give rise to an open ended diversity of entities (with different dynamic architectures) of the same kind in a dynamic that can give rise to an open ended diversity of recursive processes that in their turn give rise to the composition of an open ended diversity of singular dynamic entities.

== Life and career ==
Maturana was born in Santiago, Chile. After completing secondary school at the Liceo Manuel de Salas in 1947, he enrolled at the University of Chile, studying first medicine in Santiago, then biology in London and Cambridge, Mass.

=== Anatomy and physiology ===
In 1954, he obtained a scholarship from the Rockefeller Foundation to study anatomy and neurophysiology with J. Z. Young (the "discoverer" of the squid giant axon and who later wrote the foreword to The Tree of Knowledge) at University College London. Maturana wrote that he was as an "invisible" student never officially accepted in University College, London. Nonetheless, he did research and produced a paper investigating the possibility of the presence of efferent fibers running from the brain to the retina. In this study, he unilaterally severed optic nerves of toads who were maintained weeks to months post-surgery. Maturana then examined the ocular and brain stumps of the cut nerves using the conventional Weigert's and Holmes's nerve fiber staining methods and although "thin", concluded that efferent fibers existed. Amphibians, unlike avian and reptile species, lacked a distinct isthmo-optic nucleus located in the caudal part of the midbrain with direct connections to the retina.

Maturana then went to Harvard for his PhD work with George B Chapman as his advisor. Chapman's speciality was cell biology and ultrastructure. Maturana produced a PhD thesis in 1958 and a research paper on the amphibian optic nerve. Why he did this particular work is not clear. Chapman was a cytologist using ultrastructural methods. He never worked on frogs or optic nerves even during his later distinguished career at Georgetown University. However, at MIT, down the street from Harvard, Jerome Lettvin was electrophysiologically recording from the frog optic nerve. Maturana made contact with Lettvin through J. Z. Young (who knew Lettvin and colleagues from work they carried out at the Zoological Station in Naples, Italy). Maturana's thesis revealed the frog optic nerve contains thirty times more fibers than previously estimated. Most of the fibers are unmyelinated and collectively the number of optic nerve fibers is around 500,000. He found that the number of fibers in the optic nerve approximately matches the number of ganglion cells in the retina.

Maturana formally joined Lettvin's laboratory at MIT's Research Laboratory of Electronics (RLE) as a post-doctoral fellow. The details from his thesis about the frog optic nerve were useful for subsequent physiological studies. Maturana and Lettvin recorded electrical activity in the frog optic nerve and in the midbrain optic tectum, the principal target of the retina. They found that the unmyelinated optic nerve fibers terminate in the most superficial layers of the tectum and the myelinated optic nerve fibers terminate in layers below. Several sets of optic nerve fibers form visuotopic maps of visual space in the tectum. They published the paper "What the Frog's Eye Tells the Frog's Brain" with Warren McCulloch and Walter Pitts, also at MIT, that became extensively cited and may have been one of the earliest papers in the realm of neuroethology.

Their work was distinguished from other similar studies at the time by using "natural" visual stimuli rather than spots of light of various sizes and durations. They discovered five physiological types of retinal ganglion cells. Four of these five types are restricted to an individual layer of the tectum. One of these types is insensitive to spots of light but are exquisitely sensitive to small, dark, convexly-shaped moving objects that they dubbed "bug detectors". Lettvin and Maturana carried out the physiological and anatomical experiments and McCulloch and Pitts, famed for earlier theoretical work modeling neurons and neural networks and for epistemological approaches to the recognition of universals, provided theoretical rigor.

Maturana, as first author, co-wrote a longer paper elaborating on the results of the frog's eye paper. The MIT group also produced a brief but notable physiological paper on regeneration of cut frog optic nerve fibers and showed they grow back to their original tectal locations. They also produced a paper describing two classes of visually evoked tectal cells. One class responded primarily to novel visual stimuli ("newness" cells); the other class responded best to stimuli repeatedly presented ("sameness" cells).

Maturana followed his anuran studies with studies in pigeon vision and with Lettvin and Wall, one of the first electrophysiological studies in octopus. After a 2 year post-doctoral period at MIT, he returned to Chile in 1960.

=== Academic career ===
Maturana was appointed Assistant Prof in Dept of Biology of Medical School of University of Chile Santiago, at the age of 32. He worked in neuroscience at the University of Chile, in the Biología del Conocer (Biology of Knowing) research center. Maturana's work has been developed and integrated into the work on ontological coaching developed by Fernando Flores and Julio Olalla.

In 1994, he received Chile's National Prize for Natural Sciences.

Maturana established his own reflection and research center, the Instituto de Formación Matriztica. In 2020, he was awarded an honorary fellowship by the Cybernetics Society.

Maturana died in Santiago on May 6, 2021, at age 92, due to pneumonia.

== Work ==
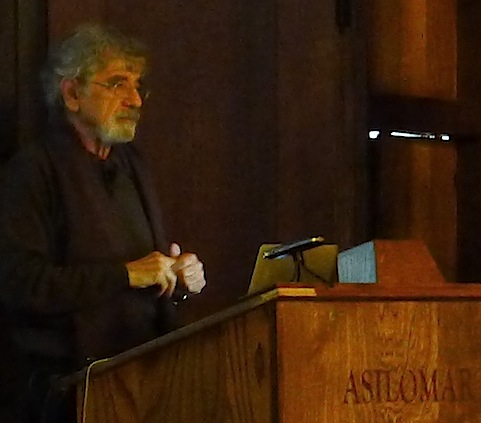
Maturana, 2012

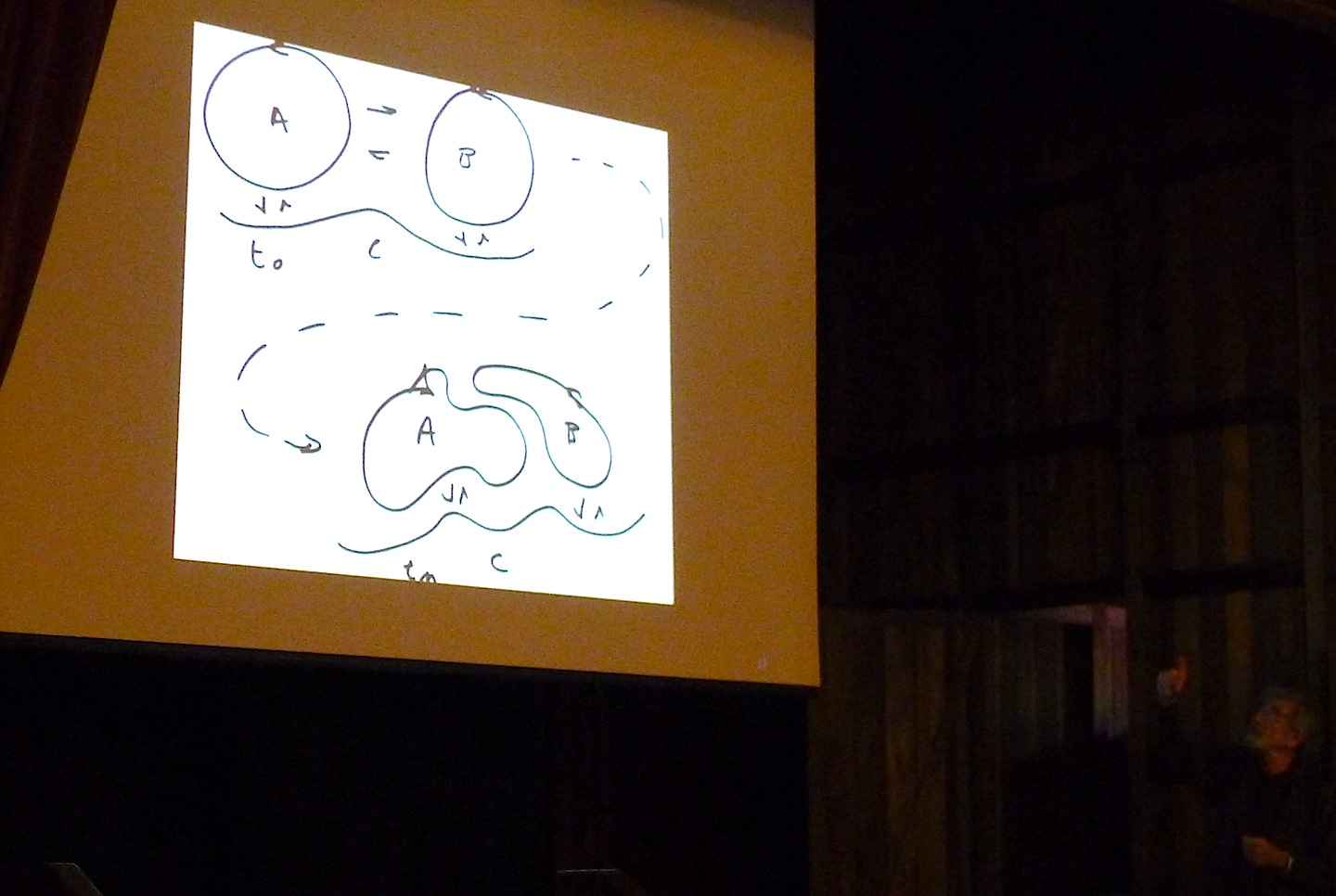
A drawing in zero time

Maturana's research interests concern concepts like cognition, autopoiesis, languaging, zero time cybernetics and structurally determined systems. Maturana's work extends to philosophy, cognitive science and even family therapy. He was inspired by the work of the biologist Jakob von Uexküll.

His inspiration for his work in cognition came while he was a medical student and became seriously ill with tuberculosis. Confined in a sanatorium with very little to read, he spent time reflecting on his condition and the nature of life. What he came to realize was "that what was peculiar to living systems was that they were discrete autonomous entities such that all the processes that they lived, they lived in reference to themselves ... whether a dog bites me or doesn't bite me, it is doing something that has to do with itself." This paradigm of autonomy formed the basis of his studies and work.

Maturana and his student Francisco Varela were the first to define and employ the concept of "autopoiesis", which was Maturana's original idea. Aside from making important contributions to the field of evolution, Maturana is associated with an epistemology built upon empirical findings in neurobiology. Maturana and Varela wrote "Living systems are cognitive systems, and living as a process is a process of cognition. This statement is valid for all organisms, with or without a nervous system."

=== Reflections on life and association with Francisco Varela ===
In an article in Constructivist Foundations. Maturana described the origins of the concept of autopoiesis and his collaboration with Varela.

== Publications ==
=== Articles on anatomy and physiology ===
- 1958 H.R. Maturana Efferent fibres in the optic nerve of the toad (Bufo bufo) J. Anat Jan 92 : 21-27. [ He thanked JZ Young “for always valuable criticism and friendly encouragement.” On the paper his institutional address is Dept. Anatomy University College, London. With present address Biological Laboratory, Harvard University, Cambridge Mass.]
- 1959 Humberto R Maturana The Fine Anatomy of the optic nerve of anurans – an electron microscope study. Journal of Biophysical and Biochemical Cytology 7 107-120 [Present address: Research Laboratory of Electronics, MIT “My appreciation to Professor G.B. Chapman under whom this work was done as a doctoral thesis”]
- 1959 Maturana, H.R. Number of Fibres in the Optic Nerve and the number of Ganglion Cells in the Retina of Anurans Nature 183 1400-1407.
- 1959 J.Y. Lettvin, H.R. Maturana, W. S. McCulloch. W.H. Pitts What the Frog’s Eye Tells The Frog’s Brain Proceedings of the IRE 47: 1940-1951.
- 1960 H.R. Maturana, J.Y. Lettvin, W. S. McCulloch. W.H. Pitts Anatomy and Physiology of Vision in the frog (Rana pipiens). J. General Physiology 43 129-175.
- 1959 H.R. Maturana, J.Y. Lettvin, W. S. McCulloch. W.H. Pitts Evidence that cut optic nerve fibers grow back to original location. Science 130: 1709-10.
- 1960 J. Y. Lettvin, H. R. Maturana, W. H. Pitts, W. S. McCulloch Two Remarks on the Visual System of the Frog [In MIT Press publication, 'Sensory Communications'].
- 1963 H.R. Maturana and S. Frenk Directional movement and horizontal edge detectors in the pigeon retina Science 142 977-979.
- 1965 H.R. Maturana and S. Frenk Synaptic connections of the centrifugal fibers in the pigeon retina. Science 150 359-361 1965.
- 1965 Boycott BB, Lettvin JY, Maturana HR, Wall PD Octopus optic responses Experimental Neurology, 12, 247-256.
- 1968 Maturana, H, G. Uribe, S. Frenk A biological theory of relativistic colour coding in the primate retina Arch Biol Med Exp. 1:1-30
- 1970 Varela, FG, Maturana, HR Time courses of excitation and inhibition in retinal ganglion cells. Experimental Neurology
- 1970 H.R. Maturana, F. Varela and S. Frenk Size Constancy and the Perception of Space Cognition I (I), pp. 97–104. 1972

=== Philosophy ===
The initial paper which stands as a prelude to all that followed:

- Biology of Cognition. Humberto R. Maturana. Biological Computer Laboratory Research Report BCL 9.0. Urbana IL: University of Illinois, 1970. As Reprinted in: Autopoiesis and Cognition: The Realization of the Living. Dordecht: D. Reidel Publishing Co., 1980, pp. 5–58.

=== Books ===
- 1979 Autopoiesis and Cognition: The Realization of the Living With Francisco Varela. (Boston Studies in the Philosophy of Science). ISBN 90-277-1015-5.
- 1984 The tree of knowledge. Biological basis of human understanding. With Francisco Varela Revised edition (92) The Tree of Knowledge: Biological Roots of Human Understanding. ISBN 978-0-87773-642-4
- 1990 Biology of Cognition and epistemology. Ed Universidad de la Frontera. Temuco, Chile.
- 1992 Conversations with Humberto Maturana: Questions to biologist Psychotherapist. With K. Ludewig. Ed Universidad de la Frontera. Temuco, Chile. 1992.
- 1994 Reflections and Conversations. With Kurt Ludewig. Collection Family Institute. FUPALI Ed. Cordova. 1994
- 1994 Democracy is a Work of Art. Collection Roundtable. Linotype Ed Bogota Bolivar y Cia.
- 1997 Objectivity - An argument to force. Santiago de Chile: Ed Dolmen.
- 1997 Machines and living things. Autopoiese to do Organização Vivo. With Francisco Varela Porto Alegre: Medical Arts, 1997.
- 2004 From Being to Doing, The Origins of the Biology of Cognition. With Bernhard Poerksen. Paperback, 2004
- 2009 The Origins of humanness in the Biology of Love. With Gerda Verden-Zoller and Pille Bunnell.
- 2004 From biology to psychology. Paperback.
- 2009 Sense of humanity. Paperback.
- 2008 Habitar humano en seis ensayos de biología-cultural. With Ximena Dávila.
- 2012 The Origin of Humanness in the Biology of Love. With Gerda Verden-Zöller. Edited by Pille Bunnell. Philosophy Document Center, Charlottesville VA; Exeter UK: Imprint Academic, Imprint Academic.
- 2015 El árbol del vivir. With Ximena Dávila.
- 2019 Historia de nuestro vivir cotidiano. With Ximena Dávila.

== See also ==
- Autopoiesis
- Constructivism (philosophy of science)
- Ernst von Glasersfeld
- Heinz von Foerster
- Molecular cellular cognition
- Neurobiology
- Neurophilosophy
- Second-order cybernetics
- Santiago theory of cognition
- Vittorio Guidano
- W. Ross Ashby
