= George B. Chapman =

American biologist (1925–2016)

George Bunker Chapman (June 10, 1925 – September 7, 2016) was a professor and a pioneer in research of cell biology and ultrastructure using transmission-light and transmission electron microscopy. He was the first person to see the interior structure of four bacterium species in electron micrographs he produced, described in his Ph.D. dissertation completed in 1953.

== Biography ==
Chapman was born in Bayonne, New Jersey on 10 June 1925 and died in Washington, D.C., on 7 September 2016. In 1943, he graduated from high school and served as a radio man in the United States Naval Reserve in the Pacific Theater in 1944–1945 during World War II. He was an undergraduate from 1946 to 1950 at Princeton University, graduating with high honors. In 1952, he earned his M.S. degree and in 1953, his Ph.D. also at Princeton.

Professor Frank H. Johnson supervised his senior thesis entitled “The isolation of a bacteriophage active against a strain of Erwinia carotovora that causes a soft rot of the onion.” Chapman published his senior-thesis research in the Journal of Bacteriology in 1950 and his Ph.D. research in the same journal in 1953. His Ph.D. thesis concerned Bacillus cereus, B. megatherium, Escherichia coli, and Protobacterium phosphoreum. In 1953–1954, he was a research assistant at Princeton University; 1954–1956, research associate at Princeton (while being employed by RCA); 1956–1960, Assistant Professor of Zoology at Harvard University; 1960–1963, Associate Professor of Anatomy at Cornell University Medical College; 1963–2011, Professor of Biology at Georgetown University; and 2011–2016, Professor Emeritus at Georgetown. Anthony S. Fauci (May 16, 2019) was among his students at Cornell University.

== Academic career ==
Chapman was the Chair of Georgetown University's Department of Biology from 1963 to 1990, where he initiated the Department's graduate program and senior-thesis requirement and increased the size of its faculty. Under his chairmanship, the Department of Biology welcomed female professors including Rita R. Colwell, Ellen J. Henderson, and Diane Wallace Taylor. The Department annually awards the Chapman Medal to senior undergraduates for outstanding research projects.

George Chapman taught cytology and histology and electron microscopy. He performed research on many kinds of cells including those of an alga, bacteria, bees, cnidarians, fish (especially the Channel Catfish), a human, a leech, a phytoplasma, protozoa, a wasp, and a whale. He published over 100 scientific papers, was a fellow of the American Society for Microbiology and won two Georgetown Bunn Awards for teaching.
