= Allopoiesis =

System producing something other than itself

Allopoiesis is the process whereby a system produces something other than the system itself. One example of this is an assembly line, where the final product (such as a car) is distinct from the machines doing the producing. This is in contrast with autopoiesis. Allopoiesis is a compound word formed from allo- (Greek prefix meaning other or different) and -poiesis (Greek suffix meaning production, creation or formation).
