= Autopoiesis =

System capable of producing itself

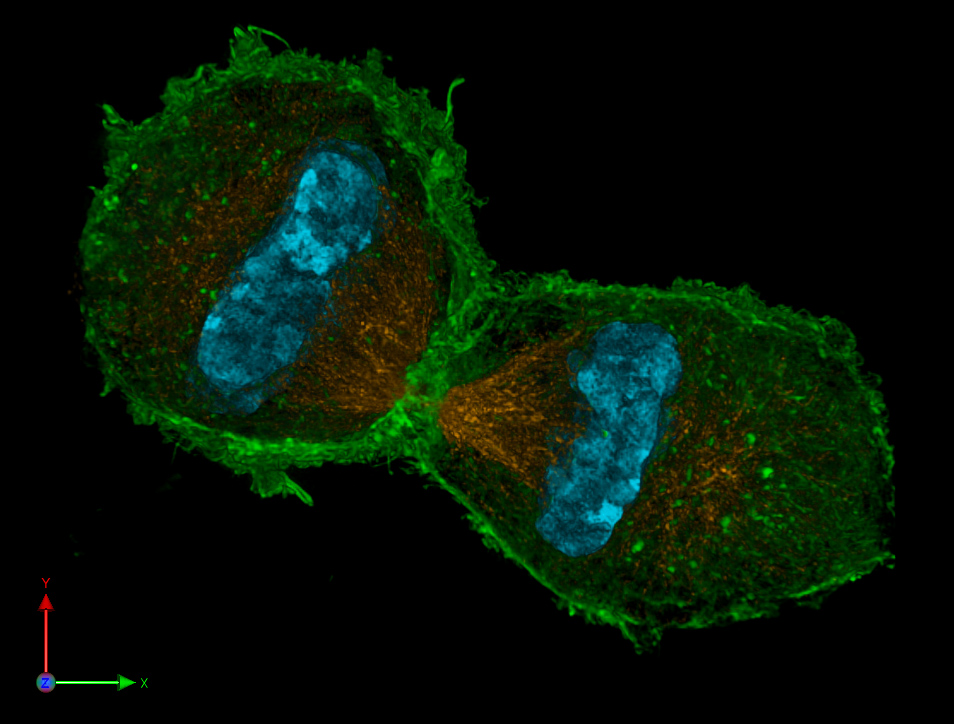
3D representation of a living cell during the process of mitosis, example of an autopoietic system

The term autopoiesis (from Greek αὐτo- (auto) 'self' and ποίησις (poiesis) 'creation, production'), one of several current theories of life, refers to a system capable of producing and maintaining itself by creating its own parts. Chilean biologists Humberto Maturana and Francisco Varela, in the 1972 publication Autopoiesis and Cognition: The Realization of the Living, introduced the term to define the self-maintaining chemistry of living cells.

The concept has since been applied to the fields of cognition, neurobiology, systems theory, architecture and sociology. Niklas Luhmann briefly introduced the concept of autopoiesis to organizational theory.

== Overview ==
Maturana describes how he invented the word autopoiesis:

"... one day, while talking with a friend (José Bulnes) about an essay of his on Don Quixote de la Mancha, in which he analyzed Don Quixote's dilemma of whether to follow the path of arms (praxis, action) or the path of letters (poiesis, creation, production), and his eventual choice of the path of praxis deferring any attempt at poiesis, I understood for the first time the power of the word 'poiesis' and invented the word that we needed: autopoiesis. This was a word without a history, a word that could directly mean what takes place in the dynamics of the autonomy proper to living systems."

— Humberto Maturana, Autopoiesis and Cognition, Introduction, page xvii

Maturana and Varela explain that:

"An autopoietic machine is a machine organized (defined as a unity) as a network of processes of production (transformation and destruction) of components which: (i) through their interactions and transformations continuously regenerate and realize the network of processes (relations) that produced them; and (ii) constitute it (the machine) as a concrete unity in space in which they (the components) exist by specifying the topological domain of its realization as such a network."

They describe the "space defined by an autopoietic system" as "self-contained", a space that "cannot be described by using dimensions that define another space. When we refer to our interactions with a concrete autopoietic system, however, we project this system on the space of our manipulations and make a description of this projection."

== Meaning ==
Autopoiesis was originally presented as a system description that was said to define and explain the nature of living systems. A canonical example of an autopoietic system is the biological cell. The eukaryotic cell, for example, is made of various biochemical components such as nucleic acids and proteins, and is organized into bounded structures such as the cell nucleus, various organelles, a cell membrane and cytoskeleton. These structures, based on an internal flow of molecules and energy, produce the components which, in turn, continue to maintain the organized bounded structure that gives rise to these components.

An autopoietic system is to be contrasted with an allopoietic system, such as a car factory, which uses raw materials (components) to generate a car (an organized structure) which is something other than itself (the factory). However, if the system is extended from the factory to include components in the factory's "environment", such as supply chains, plant / equipment, workers, dealerships, customers, contracts, competitors, cars, spare parts, and so on, then as a total viable system it could be considered to be autopoietic.

Autopoiesis in biological systems can be viewed as a network of constraints that work to maintain themselves. This concept has been called organizational closure or constraint closure and is closely related to the study of autocatalytic chemical networks where constraints are reactions required to sustain life.

Though others have often used the term as a synonym for self-organization, Maturana himself stated he would "[n]ever use the notion of self-organization ... Operationally it is impossible. That is, if the organization of a thing changes, the thing changes". Moreover, an autopoietic system is autonomous and operationally closed, in the sense that there are sufficient processes within it to maintain the whole. Autopoietic systems are "structurally coupled" with their medium, embedded in a dynamic of changes that can be recalled as sensory-motor coupling. This continuous dynamic is considered as a rudimentary form of knowledge or cognition and can be observed throughout life-forms.

An application of the concept of autopoiesis to sociology can be found in Niklas Luhmann's Systems Theory, which was subsequently adapted by Bob Jessop in his studies of the capitalist state system. Marjatta Maula adapted the concept of autopoiesis in a business context. The theory of autopoiesis has also been applied in the context of legal systems by not only Niklas Luhmann, but also Gunther Teubner. Patrik Schumacher has applied the term to refer to the 'discursive self-referential making of architecture.' Varela eventually further applied autopoesis to develop models of mind, brain, and behavior called non-representationalist, enactive, embodied cognitive neuroscience, culminating in neurophenomenology.

In the context of textual studies, Jerome McGann argues that texts are "autopoietic mechanisms operating as self-generating feedback systems that cannot be separated from those who manipulate and use them". Citing Maturana and Varela, he defines an autopoietic system as "a closed topological space that 'continuously generates and specifies its own organization through its operation as a system of production of its own components, and does this in an endless turnover of components'", concluding that "Autopoietic systems are thus distinguished from allopoietic systems, which are Cartesian and which 'have as the product of their functioning something different from themselves'". Coding and markup appear allopoietic", McGann argues, but are generative parts of the system they serve to maintain, and thus language and print or electronic technology are autopoietic systems.

The philosopher Slavoj Žižek, in his discussion of 18th- to early 19th-century thinker Georg Wilhelm Friedrich Hegel, argues:

"Hegel is – to use today's terms – the ultimate thinker of autopoiesis, of the process of the emergence of necessary features out of chaotic contingency, the thinker of contingency's gradual self-organisation, of the gradual rise of order out of chaos."

Vlado Stankovski extends the concept of autopoiesis into the quantum domain, modelling it as a quantum-informational process grounded in physical interactions and addressing longstanding philosophical problems of identity, persistence, and knowledge within a unified formal framework. The model of quantum autopoiesis starts with the concept of photon circulation within a localised geometry. A photon carries information through its number, frequency, polarization, propagation mode and phase, thus, presenting a physical realization of a primordial symbolic alphabet. Any locally reduced coherence acts as an unitary quantum gate on the photonic information. The identity function (λs.s) of Church’s λ-calculus, which is a universal computing model, is extended in quantum autopoiesis to model a single moment of self-control and self-creation. Stable changes in the fermionic structure act as knowledge discovery, while recursive circulation of photonic information within a fermionic structure acts as recursive execution of functions.

== Relation to complexity ==
Autopoiesis can be defined as the ratio between the complexity of a system and the complexity of its environment.

This generalized view of autopoiesis considers systems as self-producing not in terms of their physical components, but in terms of its organization, which can be measured in terms of information and complexity. In other words, we can describe autopoietic systems as those producing more of their own complexity than the one produced by their environment.

— Carlos Gershenson, "Requisite Variety, Autopoiesis, and Self-organization"

Autopoiesis has been proposed as a potential mechanism of abiogenesis, by which molecules evolved into more complex cells that could support the development of life.

=== Comparison with other theories of life ===
Autopoiesis is just one of several current theories of life, including the chemoton of Tibor Gánti, the hypercycle of Manfred Eigen and Peter Schuster, the (M,R) systems of Robert Rosen, and the autocatalytic sets of Stuart Kauffman, similar to an earlier proposal by Freeman Dyson. All of these (including autopoiesis) found their original inspiration in Erwin Schrödinger's book What is Life? but at first they appear to have little in common with one another, largely because the authors did not communicate with one another, and none of them made any reference in their principal publications to any of the other theories. Nonetheless, there are more similarities than may be obvious at first sight, for example between Gánti and Rosen. Until recently there have been almost no attempts to compare the different theories and discuss them together.

== Relation to cognition ==
An extensive discussion of the connection of autopoiesis to cognition is provided by Evan Thompson in his 2007 publication, Mind in Life. The basic notion of autopoiesis as involving constructive interaction with the environment is extended to include cognition. Initially, Maturana defined cognition as behavior of an organism "with relevance to the maintenance of itself". However, computer models that are self-maintaining but non-cognitive have been devised, so some additional restrictions are needed, and the suggestion is that the maintenance process, to be cognitive, involves readjustment of the internal workings of the system in some metabolic process. On this basis it is claimed that autopoiesis is a necessary but not a sufficient condition for cognition. Thompson wrote that this distinction may or may not be fruitful, but what matters is that living systems involve autopoiesis and (if it is necessary to add this point) cognition as well. It can be noted that this definition of 'cognition' is restricted, and does not necessarily entail any awareness or consciousness by the living system. With the publication of The Embodied Mind in 1991, Varela, Thompson and Rosch applied autopoesis to make non-representationalist, and enactive models of mind, brain and behavior, which further developed embodied cognitive neuroscience, later culminating in neurophenomenology.

== Relation to consciousness ==
The connection of autopoiesis to cognition, or if necessary, of living systems to cognition, is an objective assessment ascertainable by observation of a living system.

One question that arises is about the connection between cognition seen in this manner and consciousness. The separation of cognition and consciousness recognizes that the organism may be unaware of the substratum where decisions are made. What is the connection between these realms? Thompson refers to this issue as the "explanatory gap", and one aspect of it is the hard problem of consciousness, how and why we have qualia.

A second question is whether autopoiesis can provide a bridge between these concepts. Thompson discusses this issue from the standpoint of enactivism. An autopoietic cell actively relates to its environment. Its sensory responses trigger motor behavior governed by autopoiesis, and this behavior (it is claimed) is a simplified version of a nervous system behavior. The further claim is that real-time interactions like this require attention, and an implication of attention is awareness.

== Criticism ==
There are multiple criticisms of the use of the term in both its original context, as an attempt to define and explain the living, and its various expanded usages, such as applying it to self-organizing systems in general or social systems in particular. Critics have argued that the concept and its theory fail to define or explain living systems and that, because of the extreme language of self-referentiality it uses without any external reference, it is really an attempt to give substantiation to Maturana's radical constructivist or solipsistic epistemology, or what Danilo Zolo has called instead a "desolate theology". An example is the assertion by Maturana and Varela that "We do not see what we do not see and what we do not see does not exist".

According to Razeto-Barry, the influence of Autopoiesis and Cognition: The Realization of the Living in mainstream biology has proven to be limited. Razeto-Barry believes that autopoiesis is not commonly used as the criterion for life.

Zoologist and philosopher Donna Haraway also criticizes the usage of the term, arguing that "nothing makes itself; nothing is really autopoietic or self-organizing", and suggests the use of sympoiesis, meaning "making-with", instead.

== See also ==
- Abiogenesis – Life arising from non-living matter
- Adaptive system – System that can adapt to the environment
- Allopoiesis – System producing something other than itself
- Autocatalytic set – Collection of chemical entities
- Autonomous agency theory
- Biosemiotics – Biology interpreted as a sign system
- Dissipative system – Thermodynamically open system which is not in equilibrium
- Chemoton – Abstract model for the fundamental unit of life
- Dynamical system – Mathematical model of the time dependence of a point in space
- Enactivism – Philosophical concept
- Free energy principle – Hypothesis in neuroscience
- Hypercycle (chemistry) – Cyclic sequence of self-reproducing single cycles
- Information metabolism – Psychological theory of interaction between biological organisms and their environment
- Loschmidt's paradox – Conflict between known physical principles (time symmetry and entropy)
- Niklas Luhmann – German sociologist (1927–1998)
- Non-equilibrium thermodynamics – Branch of thermodynamics
- Poietic Generator – Social network game played on a two-dimensional matrix
- Polytely – Problem-solving technique
- Quine (computing) – Self-replicating program
- Relational order theories – Theory on the importance of relations
- Robert Rosen – American theoretical biologist
- Self-replication – Type of behavior of a dynamical system
- Self-replicating machine – Device able to make copies of itself
- Viable system theory – Approach to systems analyis
