= MCC =

MCC may refer to:

== Aviation ==
- McClellan Airfield (IATA code MCC) in Sacramento, California
- Multi-crew cooperation, allowance to fly in a multi-pilot aircraft

== Buildings ==
- The High Court of the Castellania (Latin Magna Curia Castellania), the original occupant of Castellania (Valletta)#MCC, a government building and former courthouse and prison in Valletta, Malta
- Macao Cultural Centre, a cultural centre in Macau, China
- Mediterranean Conference Centre, a conference centre in Valletta, Malta
- Myanmar Convention Centre, a convention centre in Yangon, Myanmar

== Education ==
=== India ===
- Madras Christian College, in Tambaram, Chennai
- Malabar Christian College, in Calicut, Kerala State
- M. C. C. Higher Secondary School, Chennai

=== United States ===
- Macomb Community College in Macomb County, Michigan
- Madisonville Community College in Madisonville, Kentucky
- Manchester Community College (Connecticut) in Manchester, Connecticut
- Manchester Community College (New Hampshire) in Manchester, New Hampshire
- Manatee Community College in Bradenton, Florida
- Maricopa County Community College District in Maricopa County, Arizona
- Marshalltown Community College in Marshalltown, Iowa
- Massasoit Community College in Norfolk County, Massachusetts
- Maui Community College in Kahului, Maui, Hawaii
- McHenry County College in Crystal Lake, Illinois
- McLennan Community College in Waco, Texas
- Melbourne Central Catholic High School in Melbourne, Florida
- Meridian Community College in Meridian, Mississippi
- Mesa Community College in Mesa, Arizona
- Mesalands Community College in Tucumcari, New Mexico
- Metropolitan Community College (Missouri) in Kansas City, Missouri
- Michigan Christian College, now Rochester Christian University, in Rochester Hills, Michigan
- Middlesex Community College (Massachusetts) in Lowell and Bedford, Massachusetts
- Middlesex Community College (Connecticut) in Middletown, Connecticut
- Middlesex County College in Edison, New Jersey
- Mitchell Community College in Statesville, North Carolina
- Mohave Community College in Kingman, Lake Havasu City, Colorado City and Bullhead City, Arizona
- Monroe Community College in Rochester, New York
- Morgan Community College in Fort Morgan, Colorado
- Mott Community College in Flint, Michigan
- Muskegon Community College in Muskegon, Michigan

=== Elsewhere ===
- Marian Catholic College, in Griffith, New South Wales, Australia
- Maritime Christian College, in Charlottetown, Prince Edward Island, Canada
- Midlands Christian College in Gweru, Zimbabwe
- Mirzapur Cadet College, in Bangladesh
- Montserrat Community College, in Salem, Montserrat
- Mathias Corvinus Collegium, in Budapest, Hungary

== Organizations ==
=== Commercial ===
- Banca del Mezzogiorno – MedioCredito Centrale, an Italian bank
- China Metallurgical Group Corporation, a state-owned enterprise in China engaged in metallurgy business
- Manhattan Construction Company, a division of Rooney Holdings Inc., owned by Francis Rooney
- MetaComCo, a software company
- Microelectronics and Computer Technology Corporation, an American R&D consortium active in the 1980s and 1990s
- Middelburgsche Commercie Compagnie, a former Dutch trading company involved in the Atlantic slave trade
- Mitsubishi Chemical Corporation
- Mondragón Cooperative Corporation, one of the world's largest worker cooperatives
- Municipal Code Corporation, a legal publishing company in Tallahassee, Florida

=== Governmental ===
- Mass Casualty Commission
- Mysore City Corporation, India
- Mangalore City Corporation, India
- Melbourne City Council, Australia
- Metropolitan Correctional Center, Chicago, US
- Metropolitan Correctional Center, New York City, US
- Metropolitan Correctional Center, San Diego, US
- Metropolitan County Council in the UK
- Miaoli County Council, Taiwan
- Millennium Challenge Corporation, a U.S. government company which aims to reduce poverty through economic growth and investment

=== Not-for-profit ===
- Birmingham Museum Collection Centre, UK
- Madison Community Cooperative, a Housing cooperative in Madison, Wisconsin
- Massachusetts Consumers' Coalition, a consumer rights organization
- MCC Theater, an Off-Broadway theater company in New York City
- Medical Cadet Corps, a Seventh-day Adventist Church program
- Medical Council of Canada, which regulates medical practitioners
- Midland Community Center
- Montana Conservation Corps, an AmeriCorps program
- Muslim Canadian Congress, a progressive Canadian Muslim organization

=== Political ===
- Maendeleo Chap Chap Party, a Kenyan political party
- Majority Coalition Caucus, a power-sharing majority in the Washington State Senate
- Maoist Communist Centre of India, extremist faction
- Mouvement des Citoyens pour le Changement, a Belgian political party

=== Religious ===
- Mennonite Central Committee, the relief and development agency of the Mennonite and Brethren in Christ Churches in North America
- Mennonite Church Canada
- Metropolitan Community Church, an international fellowship of Christian congregations that serve LGBT communities
- Mission Community Church, an American nondenominational church
- Missionary Society of the Methodist Church in Canada
- Muslim Canadian Congress
- Muslim Community Center, a mosque in Chicago, Illinois
- Syro-Malankara Catholic Church, of India

=== Scientific ===
- Microbial Culture Collection, Pune, India, a microbial culture collection centre
- Mercator Research Institute on Global Commons and Climate Change, a scientific institute based in Berlin, Germany

== Science and technology ==
=== Biology and medicine ===
- 3-Methylcrotonyl-CoA carboxylase deficiency, an inherited metabolic disorder
- MCC (gene), a candidate colorectal tumor suppressor gene
- Merkel cell carcinoma, a rare and aggressive cancer of the skin
- Microcrystalline cellulose
- Morbus cordis coronarius, the Latin name for Coronary artery disease
- Mucociliary clearance

=== Computing ===
- MCC Interim Linux, an early Linux distribution
- Memory chip controller, a digital circuit which manages the flow of data going to and from the computer's main memory
- Mobile cloud computing, cloud computing in combination with mobile devices
- Multiversion concurrency control, a computer science term
- Maximum clade credibility tree

=== Statistics and machine learning ===
- Matthews correlation coefficient, a metric to measure 2 × 2 confusion matrices

=== Technology ===
- Microcrystalline cellulose, excipient in pharmaceutical industry
- Mission control center, a facility that manages aerospace vehicle flights
- Mission Control Centre (Cospas-Sarsat), a clearinghouse for distress signals from distress radiobeacons
- Mobile country code, used in wireless telephone network station addressing
- Motor control center, an assembly of one or more enclosed sections having a common power bus and principally containing motor control units

=== Other uses in science and technology ===
- Mesoscale convective complex, a type of thunderstorm system

== Sports ==
- Madras Cricket Club in Chennai, India
- Manchester Canoe Club in Manchester, UK
- Marylebone Cricket Club, the home of cricket in the UK
- Melbourne Cricket Club in Melbourne, Australia
- Metro Catholic Conference, a high school athletic conference in St. Louis, Missouri
- Metropolitan Catholic Colleges Sports Association, an association of catholic schools in Sydney, Australia
- Mexico City Capitanes in Mexico City, Mexico
- Michigan Collegiate Conference, former college athletic conference in Michigan
- Mid-Continent Conference, former name of the NCAA Summit League athletic conference
- Midwest Collegiate Conference, a National Association of Intercollegiate Athletics conference in Iowa and Wisconsin
- Midwestern Collegiate Conference, former name of the NCAA Horizon League athletic conference
- Milwaukee City Conference, a high school athletic conference based in Milwaukee, Wisconsin

== Correctional centers ==
- Menard Correctional Center near Menard, Illinois
- Metropolitan Correctional Center, Chicago, a federal detention center in Chicago, Illinois
- Metropolitan Correctional Center, New York, a federal detention center in Manhattan, New York
- Moberly Correctional Center in Moberly, Missouri

== Other uses ==
- 1200 (MCC), in Roman numerals
- E = m × c × c, the equation for mass–energy equivalence
- Halo: The Master Chief Collection, a collection of first-person shooter titles in the Halo franchise
- Merchant category code, assigned to companies accepting credit cards
- Mesoscale convective complex in meteorology
- Methode Cap Classique, a South African sparkling wine made by the traditional Champagne method
- Michelle Caruso-Cabrera, an American journalist and a former political candidate
- Micro Compact Car, a joint venture launched in 1995 between Mercedes Benz and Swatch; see Smart (automobile)
- Missile combat crew
- MC Championship, a Minecraft competition
- Montreal Comiccon, a comics convention in Montreal, Quebec, Canada
- Mortgage Credit Certificate, a program to provide tax credits for mortgage interest to first-time homebuyers in the US
- Motorcycle club
- Moscow Central Circle, urban railway line in Moscow
- Municipal Code of Chicago, the codification of local ordinances of the City of Chicago
- Swep, a chemical herbicide, methyl N-(3,4-dichlorophenyl)carbamate

== See also ==
- MC2 (disambiguation)
