= Flight simulator =

Technology used for training aircrew

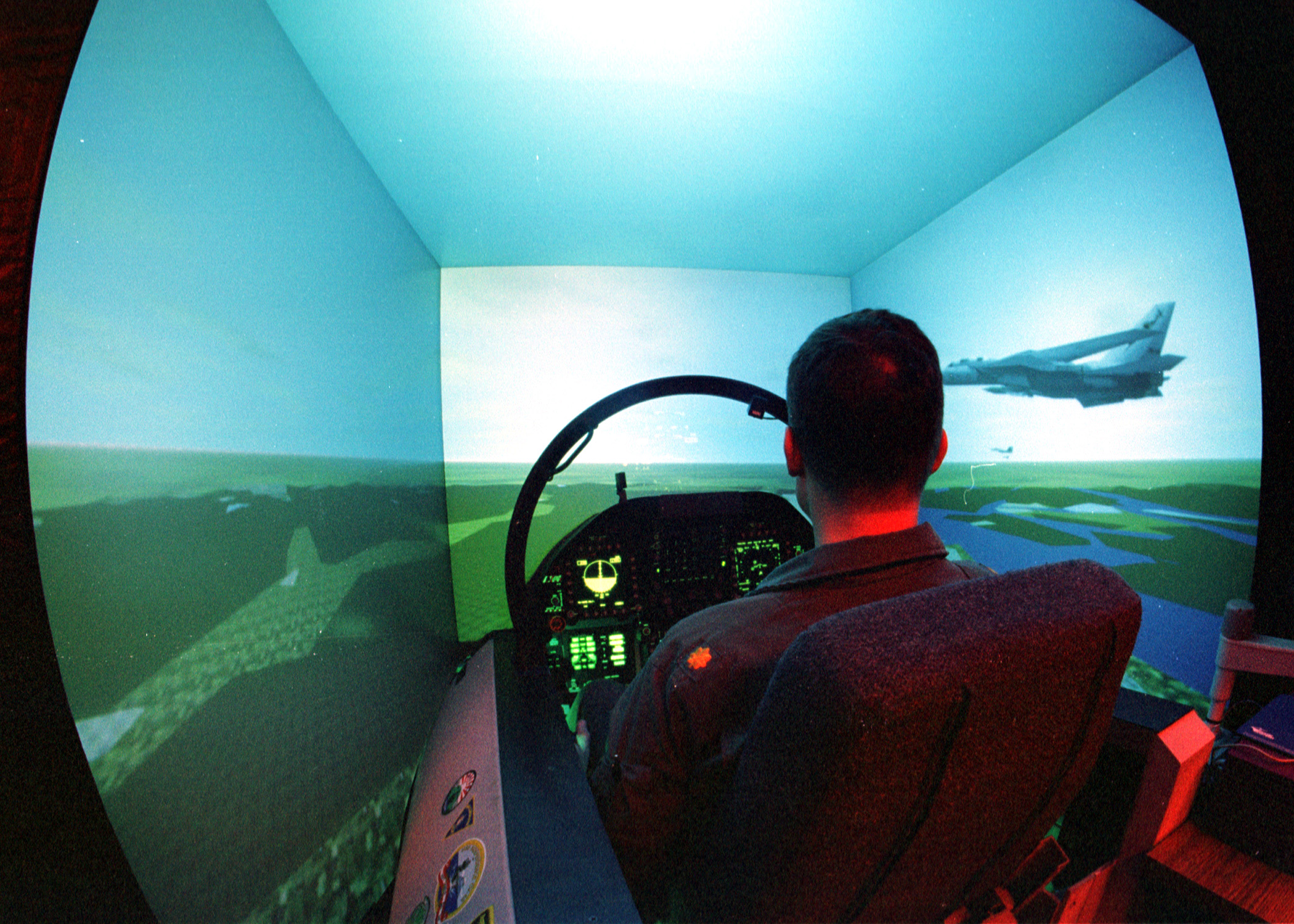
F/A-18 Hornet flight simulator aboard the USS Independence aircraft carrier

A flight simulator is a device that artificially re-creates aircraft flight and the environment in which it flies, for pilot training, design, or other purposes. It includes replicating the equations that govern how aircraft fly, how they react to applications of flight controls, the effects of other aircraft systems, and how the aircraft reacts to external factors such as air density, turbulence, wind shear, cloud, precipitation, etc. Flight simulation is used for a variety of reasons, including flight training (mainly of pilots), the design and development of the aircraft itself, and research into aircraft characteristics and control handling qualities.

The term "flight simulator" may carry slightly different meaning in general language and technical documents. In past regulations, it referred specifically to devices which can closely mimic the behavior of aircraft throughout various procedures and flight conditions. In more recent definitions, this has been named "full flight simulator". The more generic term "flight simulation training device" (FSTD) is used to refer to different kinds of flight training devices, and that corresponds more closely to meaning of the phrase "flight simulator" in general English.

== History of flight simulation ==
In 1910, on the initiative of the French commanders Clolus and Laffont and Lieutenant Clavenad, the first ground training aircraft for military aircraft were built. The "Tonneau Antoinette" (Antoinette barrel), created by the Antoinette company, seems to be the precursor of flight simulators.

=== World War I (1914–1918) ===
An area of training was for air gunnery handled by the pilot or a specialist air gunner. Firing at a moving target requires aiming ahead of the target (which involves the so-called lead angle) to allow for the time the bullets require to reach the vicinity of the target. This is sometimes also called "deflection shooting" and requires skill and practice. During World War I, some ground-based simulators were developed to teach this skill to new pilots.

=== The 1920s and 1930s ===
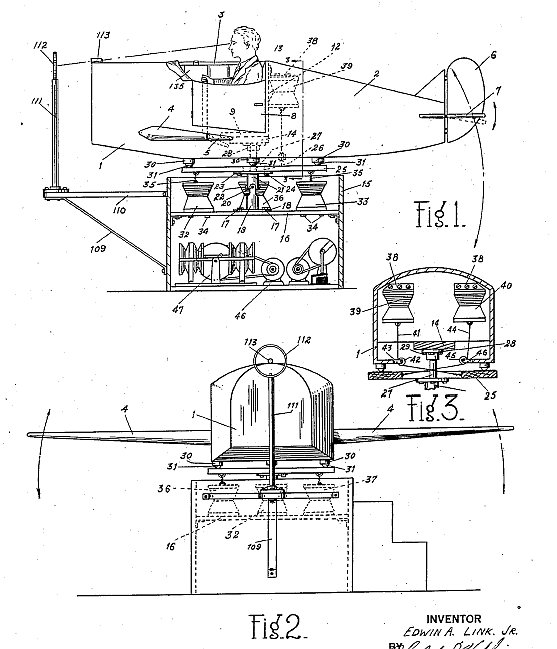
Link Trainer patent drawing, 1930

The Flying Scooters originated in the 1920s and 1930s as a flight training device, later became an amusement ride was developed by Alvin Bisch and his partner, Ralph Rocco. They applied for a patent for a "Device to train aviators or for amusement purposes" in 1929.. When in operation, a motor causes the arms to spin, with centrifugal forces causing the ride vehicles to fly outwards. Each ride vehicle is equipped with a large rudder, allowing riders to control the motion of their vehicle.

The best-known early flight simulation device was the Link Trainer, produced by Edwin Link in Binghamton, New York, United States, which he started building in 1927. He later patented his design, which was first available for sale in 1929. The Link Trainer was a basic metal frame flight simulator usually painted in its well-known blue color. Some of these early war era flight simulators still exist, but it is becoming increasingly difficult to find working examples.

The Link family firm in Binghamton manufactured player pianos and organs, and Ed Link was therefore familiar with such components as leather bellows and reed switches. He was also a pilot, but dissatisfied with the amount of real flight training that was available, he decided to build a ground-based device to provide such training without the restrictions of weather and the availability of aircraft and flight instructors. His design had a pneumatic motion platform driven by inflatable bellows which provided pitch and roll cues. A vacuum motor similar to those used in player pianos rotated the platform, providing yaw cues. A generic replica cockpit with working instruments was mounted on the motion platform. When the cockpit was covered, pilots could practice flying by instruments in a safe environment. The motion platform gave the pilot cues as to real angular motion in pitch (nose up and down), roll (wing up or down) and yaw (nose left and right).

Initially, aviation flight schools showed little interest in the "Link Trainer". Link also demonstrated his trainer to the U.S. Army Air Force (USAAF), but with no result. However, the situation changed in 1934 when the Army Air Force was given a government contract to fly the postal mail. This included having to fly in bad weather as well as good, for which the USAAF had not previously carried out much training. During the first weeks of the mail service, nearly a dozen Army pilots were killed. The Army Air Force hierarchy remembered Ed Link and his trainer. Link flew in to meet them at Newark Field in New Jersey, and they were impressed by his ability to arrive on a day with poor visibility, due to practice on his training device. The result was that the USAAF purchased six Link Trainers, and this can be said to mark the start of the world flight simulation industry.

=== World War II (1939–1945) ===
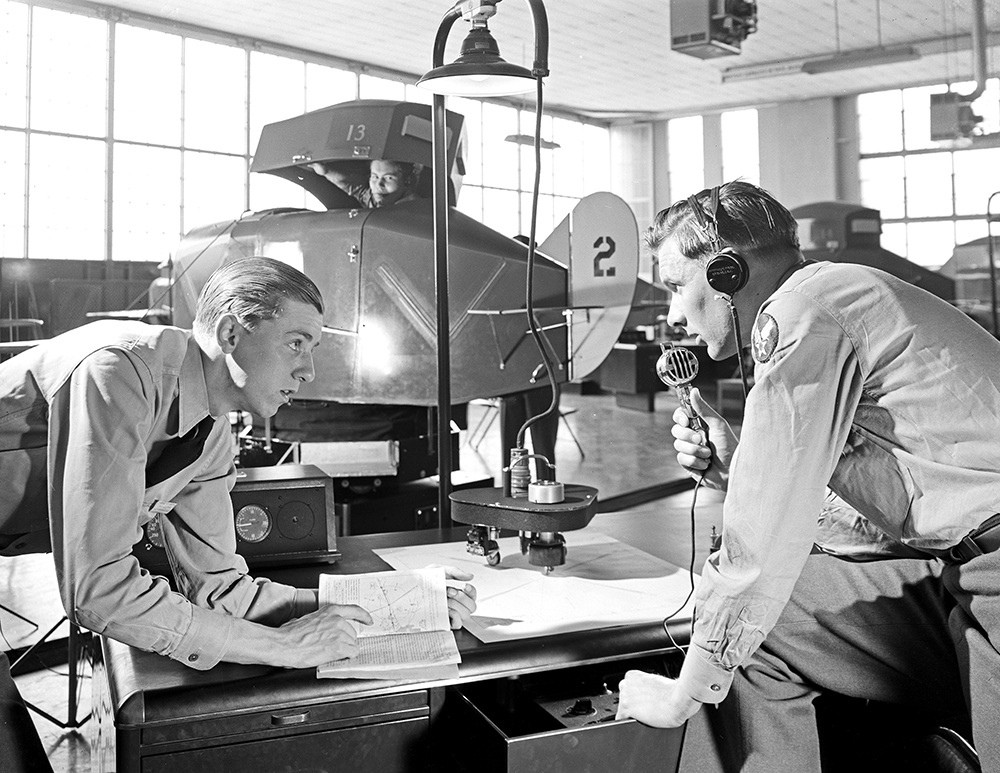
Military Personnel Using Link Trainer, Pepperell Manufacturing Co., 1943

The principal pilot trainer used during World War II was the Link Trainer. Some 10,000 were produced to train 500,000 new pilots from allied nations, many in the US and Canada because many pilots were trained in those countries before returning to Europe or the Pacific to fly combat missions. Almost all US Army Air Force pilots were trained in a Link Trainer.

A different type of World War II trainer was used for navigating at night by the stars. The Celestial Navigation Trainer of 1941 was 13.7 m (45 ft) high and capable of accommodating the navigation team of a bomber crew. It enabled sextants to be used for taking "star shots" from a projected display of the night sky.

=== 1945 to the 1960s ===
In 1954 United Airlines bought four flight simulators at a cost of $3 million from Curtiss-Wright that were similar to the earlier models, with the addition of visuals, sound and movement. This was the first of today's modern flight simulators for commercial aircraft.

A simulator for helicopters existed as the Jacobs Jaycopter as means of "Cutting helicopter training cost.". The simulator was later sold as a funfair ride in the 1964-65 New York World's Fair.

=== Today ===
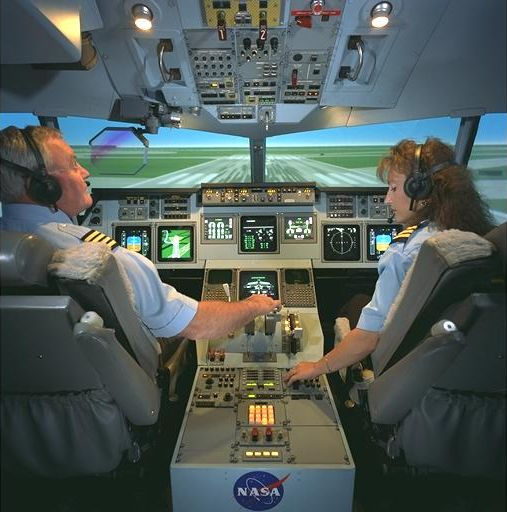
Cockpit of a twinjet flight simulator

The simulator manufacturers are consolidating and integrate vertically as training offers double-digit growth: CAE forecast 255,000 new airline pilots from 2017 to 2027 (70 a day), and 180,000 first officers evolving to captains. The largest manufacturer is Canadian CAE Inc. with a 70% market share and $2.8 billion annual revenues, manufacturing training devices for 70 years but moved into training in 2000 with multiple acquisitions. Now CAE makes more from training than from producing the simulators. Crawley-based L3 CTS entered the market in 2012 by acquiring Thales Training & Simulation's manufacturing plant near Gatwick Airport where it assembles up to 30 devices a year, then UK CTC training school in 2015, Aerosim in Sanford, Florida in 2016, and Portuguese academy G Air in October 2017. Global Training Schools like Aerosim also offer aircraft-specific simulators, such as for the Airbus A320.

With a 20% market share, equipment still accounts for more than half of L3 CTS turnover but that could soon be reversed as it educates 1,600 commercial pilots each year, 7% of the 22,000 entering the profession annually, and aims for 10% in a fragmented market. The third largest is TRU Simulation + Training, created in 2014 when parent Textron Aviation merged its simulators with Mechtronix, OPINICUS and ProFlight, focusing on simulators and developing the first full-flight simulators for the 737 MAX and the 777X. The fourth is FlightSafety International, focused on general, business and regional aircraft. Airbus and Boeing have invested in their own training centres, aiming for higher margins than aircraft manufacturing like MRO, competing with their suppliers CAE and L3.

In June 2018, there were 1,270 commercial airline simulators in service, up by 50 over a year: 85% FFSs and 15% FTDs. CAE supplied 56% of this installed base, L3 CTS 20% and FlightSafety International 10%, while CAE's training centres are the largest operator, with a 13% share. North America has 38% of the world's training devices, Asia-Pacific 25% and Europe 24%. Boeing types represent 45% of all simulated aircraft, followed by Airbus with 35%, then Embraer at 7%, Bombardier at 6% and ATR at 3%.

== Applications ==
=== Pilot training ===
Interior of a flight simulator in Estonia, for a Piper Seneca PA-34 (view as a 360° interactive panorama)

Most flight simulators are used primarily for flight training. The simplest simulators are used to practice basic cockpit procedures, such as processing emergency checklists, and for cockpit familiarization. They are also used for instrument flight training, for which the outside view is less important. Certain aircraft systems may or may not be simulated, and the aerodynamic model is usually extremely generic if present at all. Depending on the level of certification, instruments that would have moving indicators in a real aircraft may be implemented with a display. With more advanced displays, cockpit representation and motion systems, flight simulators can be used to credit different amount of flight hours towards a pilot license.

Specific classes of simulators are also used for training other than obtaining initial license such as instrument rating revalidation, or most commonly obtaining type rating for specific kind of aircraft.

=== Other uses ===
During the aircraft design process, flight simulators can be used instead of performing actual flight tests. Such "engineering flight simulators" can provide a fast way to find errors, reducing both the risks and the cost of development significantly. Additionally, this allows use of extra measurement equipment that might be too large or otherwise impractical to include during onboard a real aircraft. Throughout different phases of the design process, different engineering simulators with various level of complexity are used.

Flight simulators may include training tasks for crew other than pilots. Examples include gunners on a military aircraft or hoist operators. Separate simulators have also been used for tasks related to flight, like evacuating the aircraft in case of a crash in water. With high complexity of many systems composing contemporary aircraft, aircraft maintenance simulators are increasingly popular.

== Qualification and approval ==
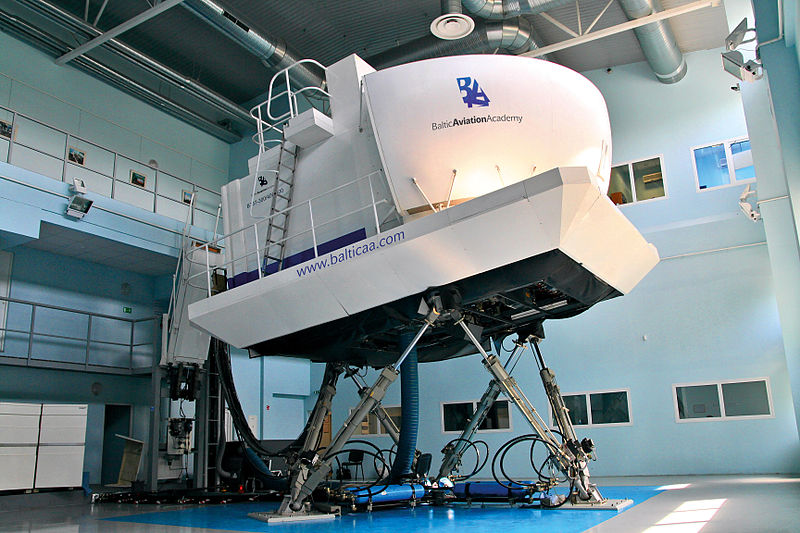
Full flight simulator of a Boeing 737

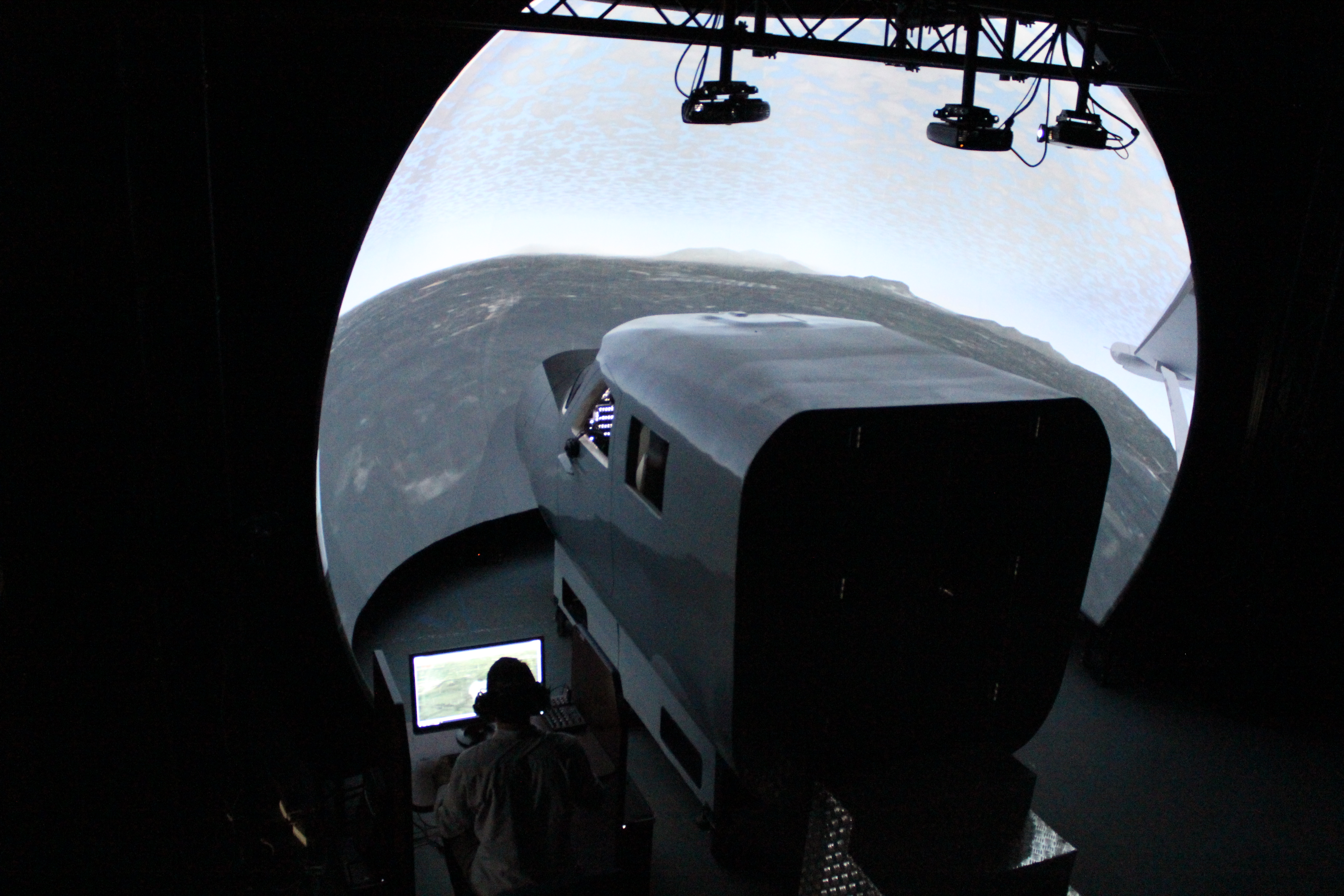
A spherical display with multiple projectors visible above the cockpit

=== Procedure ===
Before September 2018, when a manufacturer wished to have an ATD model approved, a document that contains the specifications for the model line and that proves compliance with the appropriate regulations is submitted to the FAA. Once this document, called a Qualification Approval Guide (QAG), has been approved, all future devices conforming to the QAG are automatically approved and individual evaluation is neither required nor available.

The actual procedure accepted by all CAAs (Civil Aviation Authorities) around the world is to propose 30 days prior qualification date (40 days for CAAC) a MQTG document (Master Qualification Test Guide), which is proper to a unique simulator device and will live along the device itself, containing objective, and functional and subjective tests to demonstrate the representativeness of the simulator compare to the airplane. The results will be compared to Flight Test Data provided by aircraft OEMs or from test campaign ordered by simulator OEMs or also can be compared by POM (Proof Of Match) data provided by aircraft OEMs development simulators. Some of the QTGs will be rerun during the year to prove during continuous qualification that the simulator is still in the tolerances approved by the CAA.

=== US Federal Aviation Administration (FAA) categories ===
Aviation Training Device (ATD)

- FAA Basic ATD (BATD) – Provides an adequate training platform and design for both procedural and operational performance tasks specific to the ground and flight training requirements for Private Pilot Certificate and instrument rating per Title 14 of the Code of Federal Regulations.
- FAA Advanced ATD (AATD) – Provides an adequate training platform for both procedural and operational performance tasks specific to the ground and flight training requirements for Private Pilot Certificate, instrument rating, Commercial Pilot Certificate, and Airline Transport Pilot (ATP) Certificate, and Flight Instructor Certificate.

Flight Training Devices (FTD)

- FAA FTD Level 4 – Similar to a Cockpit Procedures Trainer (CPT). This level does not require an aerodynamic model, but accurate systems modeling is required.
- FAA FTD Level 5 – Aerodynamic programming and systems modeling is required, but it may represent a family of aircraft rather than only one specific model.
- FAA FTD Level 6 – Aircraft-model-specific aerodynamic programming, control feel, and physical cockpit are required.
- FAA FTD Level 7 – Model specific. All applicable aerodynamics, flight controls, and systems must be modeled. A vibration system must be supplied. This is the first level to require a visual system.

Full Flight Simulators (FFS)

- FAA FFS Level A – A motion system is required with at least three degrees of freedom. Airplanes only.
- FAA FFS Level B – Requires three axis motion and a higher-fidelity aerodynamic model than does Level A. The lowest level of helicopter flight simulator.
- FAA FFS Level C – Requires a motion platform with all six degrees of freedom. Also lower transport delay (latency) over levels A & B. The visual system must have an outside-world horizontal field of view of at least 75 degrees for each pilot.
- FAA FFS Level D – The highest level of FFS qualification currently available. Requirements are for Level C with additions. The motion platform must have all six degrees of freedom, and the visual system must have an outside-world horizontal field of view of at least 150 degrees, with a collimated display. Realistic sounds in the cockpit are required, as well as a number of special motion and visual effects.

=== European Aviation Safety Agency (EASA, ex JAA) categories ===
These definitions apply to both airplanes and helicopters unless specified otherwise. Training devices briefly compared below are all different subclasses of Flight simulation training device (FSTD).

Basic instrument training device (BITD) airplanes only : A basic student station for instrument flight procedures; can use spring loaded flight controls, and instruments displayed on a screen

Flight Navigation and Procedures Trainer (FNPT) : Representation of cockpit with all equipment and software to replicate function of aircraft systems

- EASA FNPT Level I : Fully enclosed real-scale cockpit, control forces and travel representative of the aircraft, aerodynamic model taking into account changes to airspeed, loading and other factors
- EASA FNPT Level II : Model handling of aircraft on ground and in ground effect, effects of icing, visual system including different ambient lighting conditions (i.e. day, night, dusk)
- EASA FNPT Level III helicopters only : Wider field of view and means of quickly testing correct operation of hardware and software
- MCC : Additional requirements for FNPT Level II and III to be used for multi-crew cooperation training, for example which instruments need to be doubled for each crew member

Flight Training Devices (FTD)

- EASA FTD Level 1 : May lack a visual system, compared to FNPT the aircraft systems must operate correctly based only on pilot inputs without requiring instructor actions
- EASA FTD Level 2 : Visual system with different conditions, cockpit must include other crew stations, controls must replicate movement dynamics
- EASA FTD Level 3 helicopter only : Model data must be based on validation flights - cannot be generic aerodynamical model, wider field of view

Full Flight Simulators (FFS)

- EASA FFS Level A : Motion system with 3 degrees of freedom (pitch, roll, heave)
- EASA FFS Level B : Motion system with all 6 degrees of freedom, modelling ground handling
- EASA FFS Level C : Simulate different runway conditions, icing, more detailed aerodynamic model
- EASA FFS Level D : Characteristic vibrations that can be felt in the cockpit, realistic noise levels

== Technology ==
=== Simulator structure ===
Flight simulator block diagram

Flight simulators are an example of a human-in-the-loop system, in which interaction with a human user is constantly happening. From perspective of the device, the inputs are primary flight controls, instrument panel buttons and switches and the instructor's station, if present. Based on these, the internal state is updated, and equations of motion solved for the new time step. The new state of the simulated aircraft is shown to the user through visual, auditory, motion and touch channels.

To simulate cooperative tasks, the simulator can be suited for multiple users, as is the case with multi-crew cooperation simulators. Alternatively, more simulators can be connected, what is known as "parallel simulation" or "distributed simulation". As military aircraft often need to cooperate with other craft or military personnel, wargames are a common use for distributed simulation. Because of that, numerous standards for distributed simulation including aircraft have been developed with military organisations. Some examples include SIMNET, DIS and HLA .

=== Simulation models ===
The central element of a simulation model are the equations of motion for the aircraft. As the aircraft moves through atmosphere it can exhibit both translational and rotational degrees of freedom. To achieve perception of fluent movement, these equations are solved 50 or 60 times per second. The forces for motion are calculated from aerodynamical models, which in turn depend on state of control surfaces, driven by specific systems, with their avionics, etc. As is the case with modelling, depending on the required level of realism, there are different levels of detail, with some sub-models omitted in simpler simulators.

If a human user is part of the simulator, which might not be the case for some engineering simulators, there is a need to perform the simulation in real-time. Low refresh rates not only reduce realism of simulation, but they have also been linked with increase in simulator sickness. The regulations place a limit on maximum latency between pilot input and aircraft reaction. Because of that, tradeoffs are made to reach the required level of realism with a lower computational cost. Flight simulators typically don't include full computational fluid dynamics models for forces or weather, but use databases of prepared results from calculations and data acquired in real flights. As an example, instead of simulating flow over the wings, lift coefficient may be defined in terms of motion parameters like angle of attack.

While different models need to exchange data, most often they can be separated into a modular architecture, for better organisation and ease of development. Typically, gear model for ground handling would be separate input to the main equations of motion. Each engine and avionics instrument is also a self-contained system with well-defined inputs and outputs.

=== Instruments ===
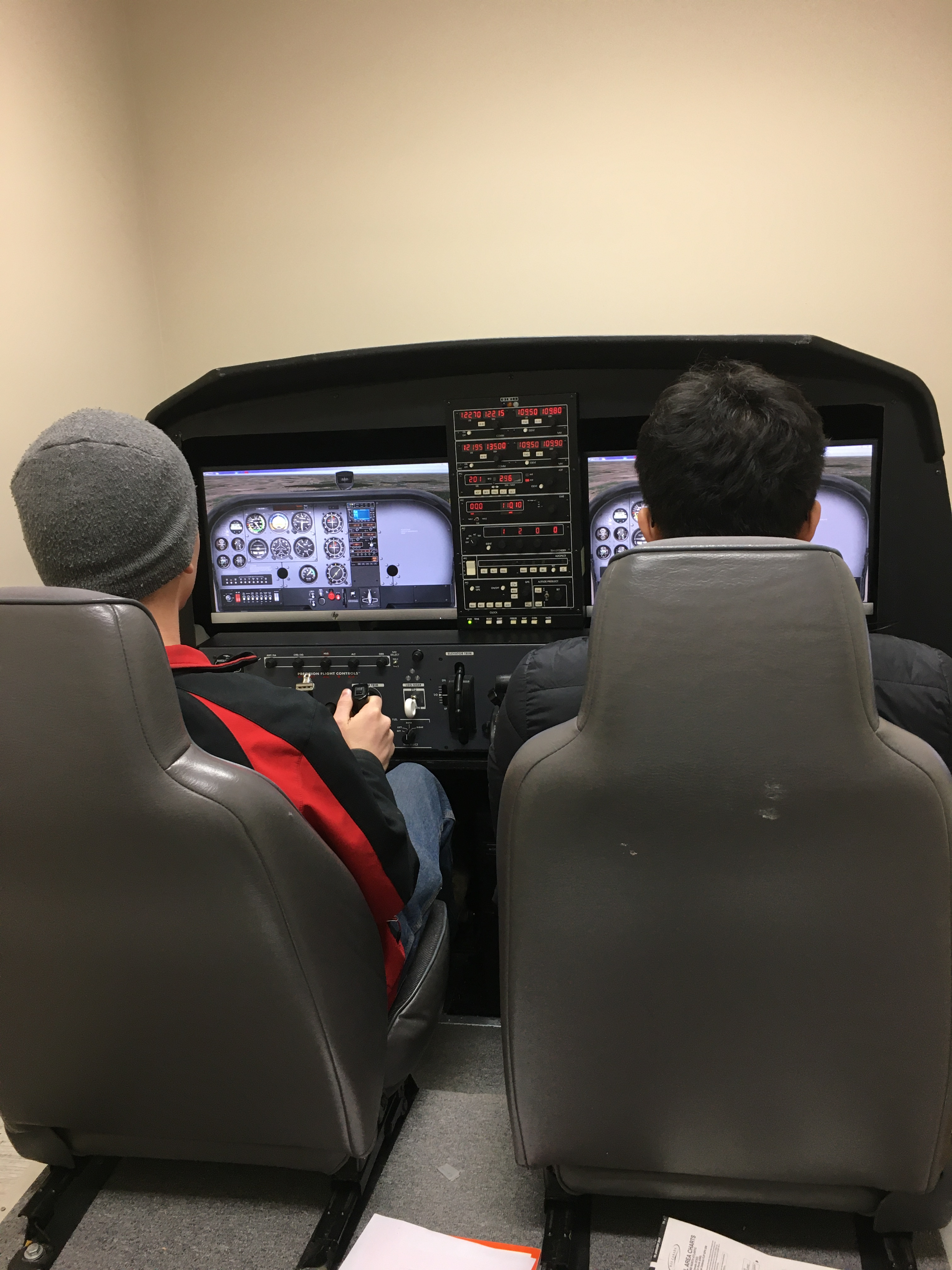
Simulator with primary flight instruments replicated with flat displays

All classes of FSTD require some form of replicating the cockpit. As they are the primary means of interaction between the pilot and the aircraft special importance is assigned to cockpit controls. To achieve good transfer of skills, there are very specific requirements in the flight simulator regulations that determine how closely they must match the real aircraft. These requirements in case of full flight simulators are so detailed, that it may be cost-effective to use the real part certified to fly, rather than manufacture a dedicated replica. Lower classes of simulators may use springs to mimic forces felt when moving the controls. When there is a need to better replicate the control forces or dynamic response, many simulators are equipped with actively driven force feedback systems. Vibration actuators may also be included, either due to helicopter simulation requirements, or for aircraft equipped with a stick shaker.

Another form of tactile input from the pilot are instruments located on the panels in the cockpit. As they are used to interact with various aircraft systems, just that may be sufficient for some forms of procedure training. Displaying them on a screen is sufficient for the most basic BITD simulators and amateur flight simulation, however most classes of certified simulators need all buttons, switches and other inputs to be operated in the same way as in the aircraft cockpit. The necessity for a physical copy of a cockpit contributes to the cost of simulator construction, and ties the hardware to a specific aircraft type. Because of these reasons, there is ongoing research on interactions in virtual reality, however lack of tactile feedback negatively affects users' performance when using this technology.

=== Visual system ===
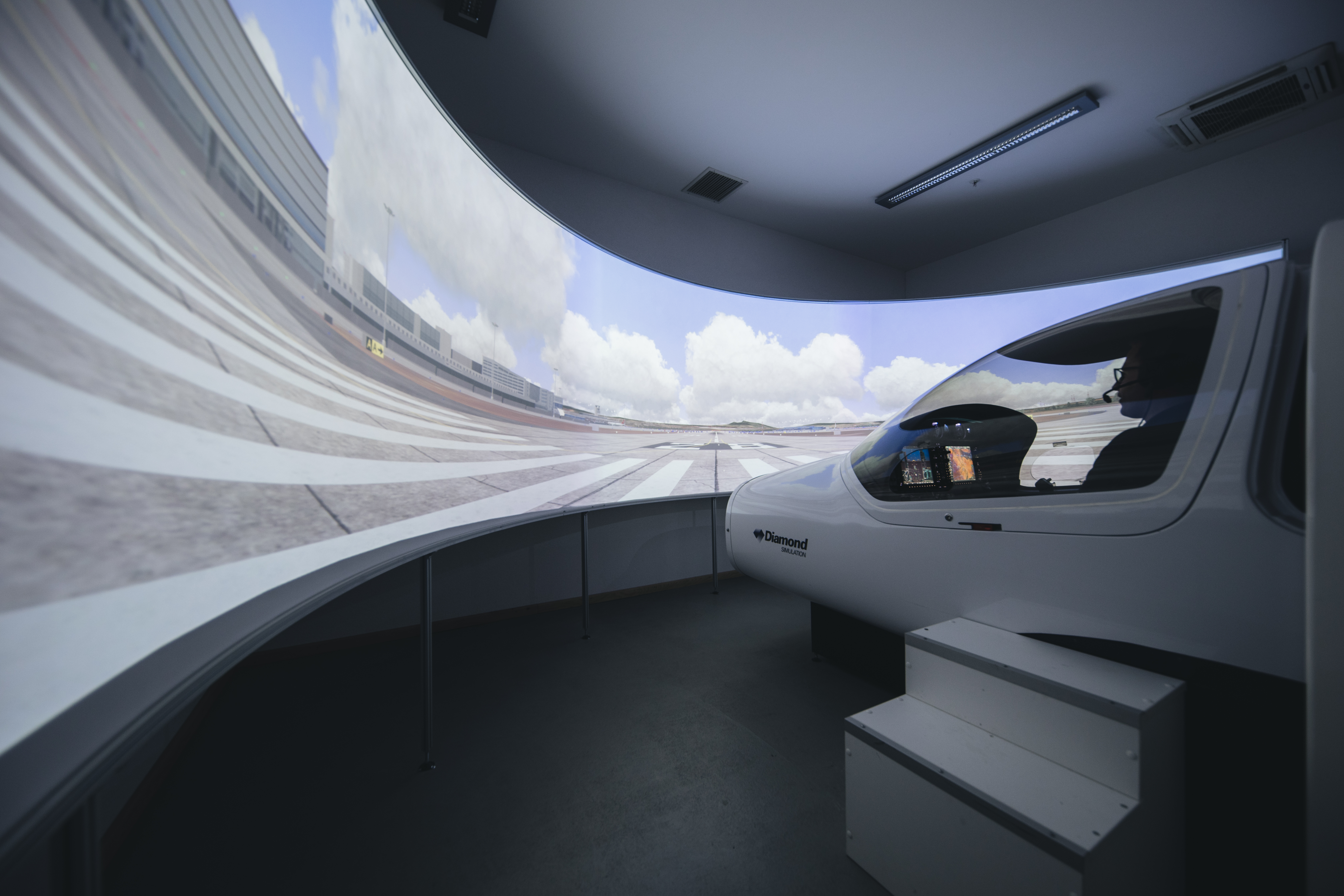
A wide angle cylindrical display

Outside view from the aircraft is an important cue for flying the aircraft, and is the primary means of navigation for visual flight rules operation. One of the primary characteristics of a visual system is the field of view. Depending on the simulator type it may be sufficient to provide only a view forward using a flat display. However, some types of craft, e.g. fighter aircraft, require a very large field of view, preferably almost full sphere, due to the manoeuvres that are performed during air combat. Similarly, since helicopters can perform hover flight in any direction, some classes of helicopter flight simulators require even 180 degrees of horizontal field of view.

There are many parameters in visual system design. For a narrow field of view, a single display may be sufficient, however typically multiple projectors are required. This arrangement needs additional calibration, both in terms of distortion from not projecting on a flat surface, as well as brightness in regions with overlapping projections. There are also different shapes of screens used, including cylindrical, spherical or ellipsoidal. The image can be projected on the viewing side of the projection screen, or alternatively "back-projection" onto a translucent screen. Because the screen is much closer than objects outside aircraft, the most advanced flight simulators employ cross-cockpit collimated displays that eliminate the parallax effect between the pilots' point of view, and provide a more realistic view of distant objects.

An alternative to large-scale displays are virtual reality simulators using a head-mounted display. This approach allows for a complete field of view, and makes the simulator size considerably smaller. There are examples of use in research, as well as certified FSTD.

==== Contribution to modern computer graphics ====
Visual simulation science applied from the visual systems developed in flight simulators were also an important precursor to three dimensional computer graphics and Computer Generated Imagery (CGI) systems today. Namely because the object of flight simulation is to reproduce on the ground the behavior of an aircraft in flight. Much of this reproduction had to do with believable visual synthesis that mimicked reality. Combined with the need to pair virtual synthesis with military level training requirements, graphics technologies applied in flight simulation were often years ahead of what would have been available in commercial products. When CGI was first used to train pilots, early systems proved effective for certain simple training missions but needed further development for sophisticated training tasks as terrain following and other tactical maneuvers. Early CGI systems could depict only objects consisting of planar polygons. Advances in algorithms and electronics in flight simulator visual systems and CGI in the 1970s and 1980s influenced many technologies still used in modern graphics. Over time CGI systems were able to superimpose texture over the surfaces and transition from one level of image detail to the next one in a smooth manner. Real-time computer graphics visualization of virtual worlds makes some aspects of flight simulator visual systems very similar to game engines, sharing some techniques like different levels of details or libraries like OpenGL. Many computer graphics visionaries began their careers at Evans & Sutherland and Link Flight Simulation, Division of Singer Company, two leading companies in flight simulation before today's modern computing era. For example, the Singer Link Digital Image Generator (DIG) created in 1978 was considered one of the worlds first CGI system.

=== Motion system ===
Stewart platform

Initially, the motion systems used separate axes of movement, similar to a gimbal. After the invention of Stewart platform simultaneous operation of all actuators became the preferred choice, with some FFS regulations specifically requiring "synergistic" 6 degrees of freedom motion. In contrast to real aircraft, the simulated motion system has a limited range in which it is able to move. That especially affects the ability to simulate sustained accelerations, and requires a separate model to approximate the cues to the human vestibular system within the given constraints.

Motion system is a major contributor to overall simulator cost, but assessments of skill transfer based on training on a simulator and leading to handling an actual aircraft are difficult to make, particularly where motion cues are concerned. Large samples of pilot opinion are required and many subjective opinions tend to be aired, particularly by pilots not used to making objective assessments and responding to a structured test schedule. For many years, it was believed that 6 DOF motion-based simulation gave the pilot closer fidelity to flight control operations and aircraft responses to control inputs and external forces and gave a better training outcome for students than non-motion-based simulation. This is described as "handling fidelity", which can be assessed by test flight standards such as the numerical Cooper-Harper rating scale for handling qualities. Recent scientific studies have shown that the use of technology such as vibration or dynamic seats within flight simulators can be equally effective in the delivery of training as large and expensive 6-DOF FFS devices.

== Modern high-end flight simulators ==
=== Vertical Motion Simulator (VMS) at NASA/Ames ===
The largest flight simulator in the world is the Vertical Motion Simulator (VMS) at NASA Ames Research Center, in Mountain View, California. This has a very large-throw motion system with 60 feet (+/- 30 ft) of vertical movement (heave). The heave system supports a horizontal beam on which are mounted 40 ft rails, allowing lateral movement of a simulator cab of +/- 20 feet. A conventional 6-degree of freedom hexapod platform is mounted on the 40 ft beam, and an interchangeable cabin is mounted on the platform. This design permits quick switching of different aircraft cabins. Simulations have ranged from blimps, commercial and military aircraft to the Space Shuttle. In the case of the Space Shuttle, the large Vertical Motion Simulator was used to investigate a longitudinal pilot-induced oscillation (PIO) that occurred on an early Shuttle flight just before landing. After identification of the problem on the VMS, it was used to try different longitudinal control algorithms and recommend the best for use in the Shuttle program.

=== Disorientation training ===
AMST Systemtechnik GmbH (AMST) of Austria and Environmental Tectonics Corporation (ETC) of Philadelphia, US, manufacture a range of simulators for disorientation training, that have full freedom in yaw. The most complex of these devices is the Desdemona simulator at the TNO Research Institute in The Netherlands, manufactured by AMST. This large simulator has a gimballed cockpit mounted on a framework which adds vertical motion. The framework is mounted on rails attached to a rotating platform. The rails allow the simulator cab to be positioned at different radii from the centre of rotation and this gives a sustained G capability up to about 3.5.

== See also ==
- FlightSimCon
- Full motion racing simulator
- List of flight simulator video games
- Synthetic vision system
- Unmanned Aircraft System Simulation
- Virtual reality simulator
