= Mortgage certificate =

Mortgage certificate may refer to:

- Russian mortgage certificate
- Mortgage Credit Certificate (United States)
- Mortgage certificate (Switzerland)
