= CCDC180 =

Protein-coding gene in humans

Identifiers
- Aliases: CCDC180, BDAG1, C9orf174, KIAA1529, coiled-coil domain containing 180, CFAP76, FAP76
- External IDs: MGI: 2685871; GeneCards: CCDC180

Gene location (Mouse)
Chr.	Chromosome 4 (mouse)
Band	4|4 B1	Start	45,890,303 bp
Band	4|4 B1	End	45,950,774 bp
RNA expression pattern
Bgee	Human / Mouse (ortholog); Top expressed in: right uterine tube; sural nerve; superior frontal gyrus; corpus callosum; right lobe of thyroid gland; hypothalamus; endometrium; hippocampus proper; caudate nucleus; renal cortex / Top expressed in: fourth ventricle; choroid plexus of fourth ventricle; choroidal fissure; spermatid; spermatocyte; seminiferous tubule; granulocyte; primary oocyte; epithelium of lens; secondary oocyte; More reference expression data
BioGPS	n/a
Orthologs
Databases	NCBI: entry
Species	Human	Mouse
Entrez	100499483	381522
Ensembl	n/a	ENSMUSG00000035539
UniProt	Q9P1Z9	n/a
RefSeq (mRNA)	NM_020893; NM_001348010	NM_198660
RefSeq (protein)	NP_001334939; NP_065944	n/a
Location (UCSC)	n/a	Chr 4: 45.89 – 45.95 Mb
PubMed search
- Wikidata
View/Edit Human	View/Edit Mouse

Coiled-coil domain containing protein 180 (CCDC180) is a protein that in humans is encoded by the CCDC180 gene. This protein is known to localize to the nucleus and is thought to be involved in regulation of transcription as are many proteins containing coiled-coil domains. As it is expressed most highly in the testes and is regulated by SRY and SOX transcription factors, it could be involved in sex determination.

== Gene ==
The location of CCDC180 on human chromosome 9 within locus 9q22.33 is marked with a line.

=== Locus ===
CCDC180 is located on chromosome 9 at the locus 9q22.33.

=== Common aliases ===
CCDC180 is also known by the aliases KIAA1529, BDAG1 (Behçet's Disease Associated Gene 1), and C9orf174.

=== Gene features ===
The CCDC180 gene is 71,221 bases long. It contains 37 exons and is oriented on the forward strand of the chromosome.

== mRNA ==
There are no known isoforms or alternative splicing variants of the CCDC180 mRNA.

== Protein ==
=== General features ===
CCDC180 contains 1,701 amino acids and has a molecular weight of 197.3 kDa. The isoelectric point (pI) is 5.74. The low pI is attributed to a relatively high concentration of glutamic acid when compared to other human proteins at 12.9%. CCDC180 also contains a relatively low concentration of glycine when compared to the average human protein at 3.5%.

=== Domains ===
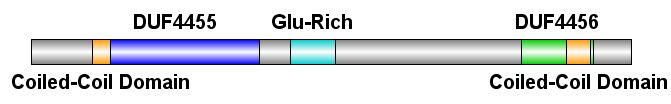
Here are shown the major domains present within the protein CCDC180: Domains of Unknown Function 4455 and 4456, two coiled-coil domains, and a glutamic acid rich domain.

CCDC180 contains two domains of unknown function (DUFs): DUF4455 and DUF4456. There are also two coiled-coil regions which overlap with the DUFs. There is a region of low complexity that is very rich in glutamic acid.

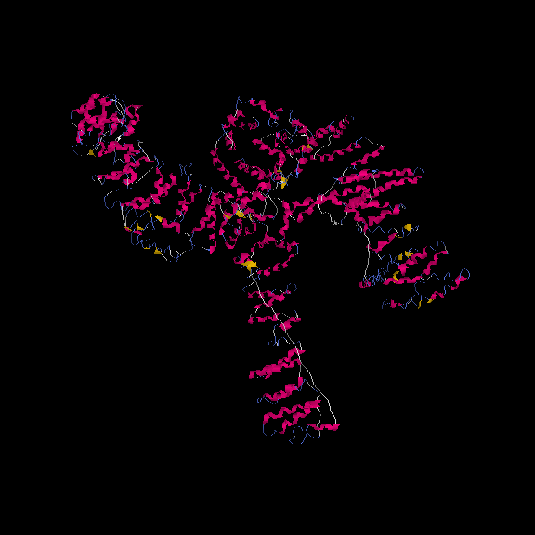
A model of CCDC180 secondary and tertiary structure predicted by the University of Michigan I-TASSER server

=== Secondary and tertiary structure ===
The secondary structure of CCDC180 is predicted to be almost completely composed of alpha helices, with only a few predicted beta sheets. The tertiary structure is not completely characterized as yet, but a model predicted by the I-TASSER server at the University of Michigan is pictured.

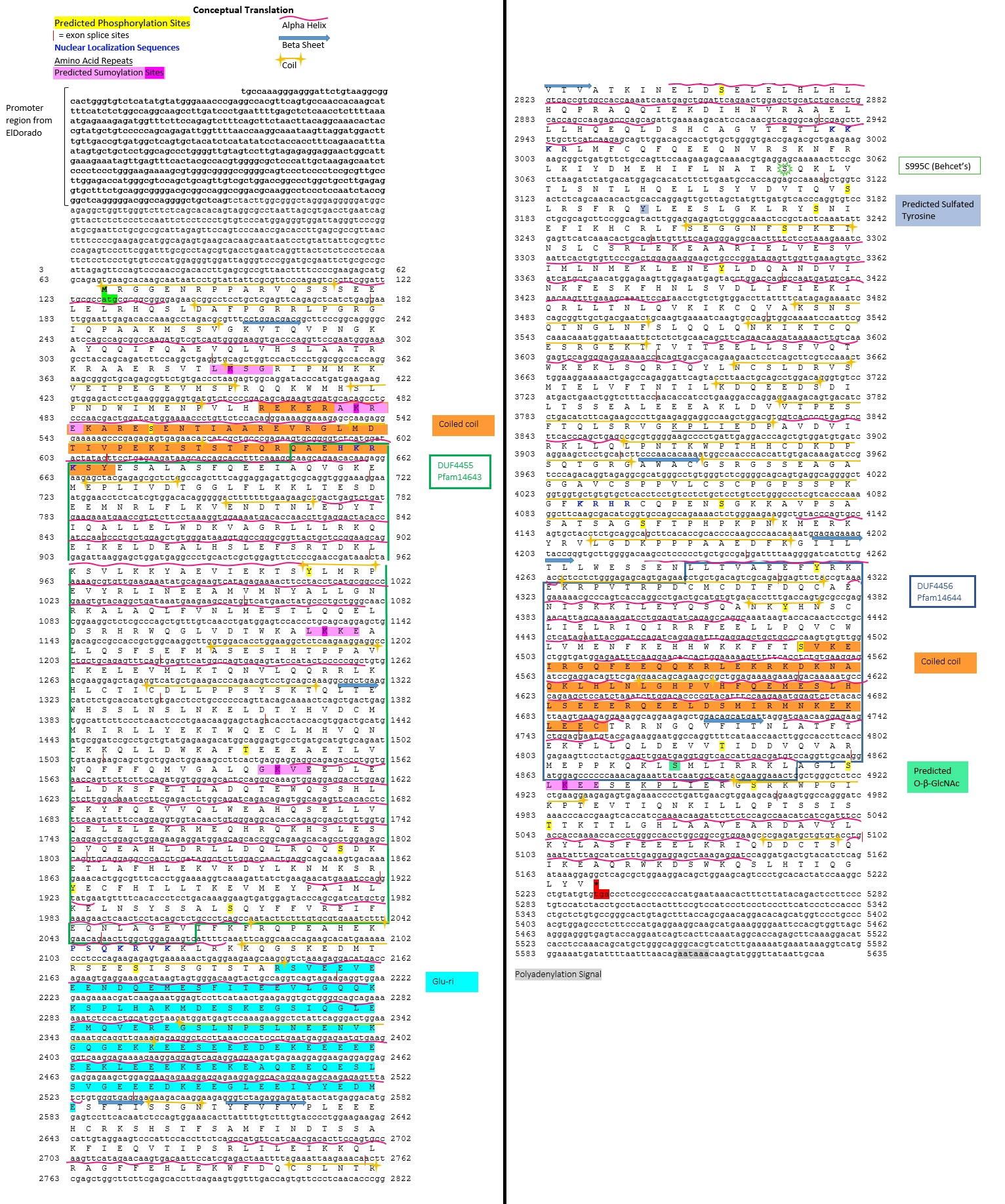
Translation of the mRNA and protein sequence for the human protein CCDC180, including domains, secondary structure, exon splice sites, and post-translation modification sites

=== Post-translational modifications ===
CCDC180 is predicted to undergo a variety of post-translational modifications:

- Phosphorylation on serine, threonine, and tyrosine residues
- Tyrosine sulfation
- Sumoylation
- O-linked β-N-acetylglucosamine modification of a serine residue

Modification	Position	Context
Serine Phosphorylation	195	KARESENTI
Serine Phosphorylation	627	LRQQSDKET
Serine Phosphorylation	680	SSALSQYFF
Serine Phosphorylation	734	RSEESISSG
Serine Phosphorylation	961	NELDSELEL
Serine Phosphorylation	1069	VTQVSLRSF
Serine Phosphorylation	1087	KLRYSNIEF
Serine Phosphorylation	1105	GGNFSPKEI
Serine Phosphorylation	1381	QPENSGKKA
Serine Phosphorylation	1396	TSAGSFTPH
Serine Phosphorylation	1526	KFFTSKVEI
Serine Phosphorylation	1649	LAGLSLKEE
Serine Phosphorylation	1663	IERGSRKWP
Threonine Phosphorylation	521	WKAFTEEEA
Threonine Phosphorylation	1621	DEVVTIDDV
Threonine Phosphorylation	1690	SSISTTKTT
Tyrosine Phosphorylation	345	EKTSYLMRP
Tyrosine Phosphorylation	650	MKSRYECFH
Tyrosine Phosphorylation	1141	LENEYLDQA
Tyrosine Phosphorylation	1447	AEEFYRKEK
Tyrosine Phosphorylation	1485	QANKYHNSC
Sumoylation	89	ERSVTLKSGRIPMM
Sumoylation	137	REKERAKREKARES
Sumoylation	355	DTWKALKKEALLQS
Sumoylation	492	VGALQGKVEEDLEL
Sumoylation	1590	LAGLSLKEESEKPL
Serine O-linked β-N-acetylglucosamine	1635	KQKLSMLIRR

=== Subcellular localization ===
CCDC180 is predicted to localize to the nucleus, and it contains four nuclear localization sequences.

== Expression ==
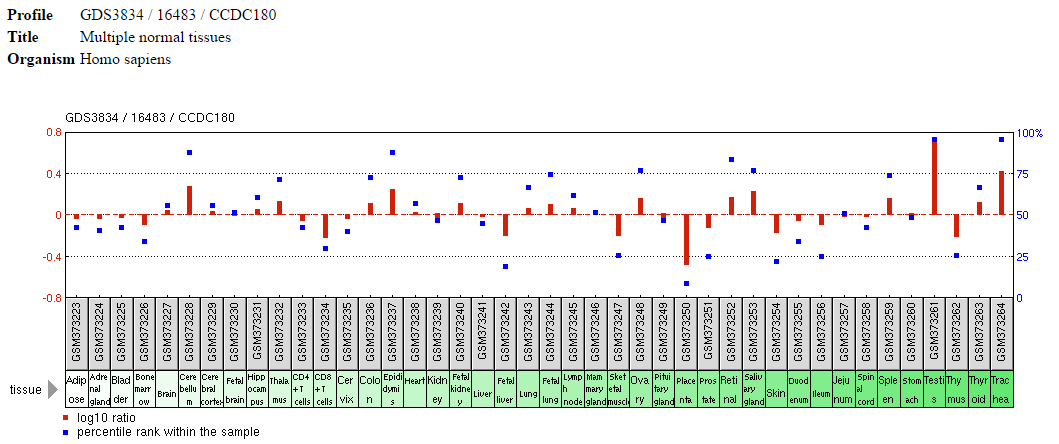
GEO Profile for the expression of the human protein CCDC180 in normal tissues

CCDC180 is expressed ubiquitously at low levels throughout the body, and the highest expression is consistently seen to be in the testes. Other replicated tissues of high expression include the trachea and eye.

== Regulation of expression ==
=== Transcriptional regulation ===
Transcription of CCDC180 is predicted to be regulated by a 664 base pair promoter region, with the ID GXP_1829211. This prediction is supported by the transcripts GXT_23217882, GXT_24495001, GXT_24495002, and GXT_24495003. Transcription factors predicted to bind to this promoter region are described below.

- Ccaat-enhancer binding protein
- KRAB domain zinc finger protein 57
- Krüppel-like C2H2 zinc finger factors
- Octamer binding protein
- SRY box 9
- GLI zinc finger family
- RXR heterodimers
- SOX factors
- E-box binding factors
- Nerve growth factor-induced protein C
- Myc-associated zinc finger
- GC-binding factor 2
- X-box binding protein 1
- Histone nuclear factor P

== Interacting proteins ==
The following proteins have been shown to interact with CCDC180 in yeast two-hybrid assays.

Protein	Function
Y box binding protein 1	DNA and RNA binding, transcriptional and translational regulation
Mitotic checkpoint serine/threonine kinase	Assists in spindle assembly during mitosis
B-cell CLL/Lymphoma 10	Induces apoptosis and activates NF-κB
Neuroblastoma RAS viral oncogene homolog	Regulates cell division
Erb-B2 receptor tyrosine kinase 2	Stabilizes ligand binding in other EGF receptor family members
Retinoblastoma 1	Negative regulation of cell cycle progression
Proto-oncogene tyrosine-protein kinase Src	Signal transduction
Mutated in colorectal cancers	Negative regulation of cell cycle progression
Catenin alpha 1	Associates with cadherins
mutL homolog 1	DNA repair
Postmeitotic segregation increased 2	DNA mismatch repair
Phosphatase and tensin homolog	Tumor suppression
Protein tyrosine phosphatase, non-receptor type 12	Signal transduction
Mothers against decapentaplegic homolog 4	Transcription regulation
Platelet-derived growth factor receptor-like	Unknown, possible tumor suppression
Serine/threonine kinase 11	Regulates cell polarity
Cycline-dependent kinase inhibitor 2A	Stabilizes p53
Folliculin	Unknown, possible tumor suppression
DLC Rho GTPase activating protein	Regulates small GTP-binding proteins
mutL homolog 3	DNA repair

== Clinical significance ==
A single-nucleotide polymorphism (SNP) in the gene that leads to a single amino acid change (S995C) has been shown in a genome-wide association study to be significantly associated with Behçet's disease, and this designation led to the alias Behcet's disease-associated gene 1 (BDAG1). The role of CCDC180 in the disease phenotype is unknown.

== Homology ==
There are no paralogs in humans for this gene, but there are orthologs in a wide variety of organisms, extending back to single-celled green algae. CCDC180 is not conserved in bacteria, archaea, plants, fungi, or protists. The following table includes a subset of species containing protein orthologs of CCDC180. It is not exhaustive, but it indicates the variety of species containing orthologs of CCDC180.

Genus and species	Common name	Divergence from Humans	Accession #	Sequence Length	% Identity	% Similarity
Homo sapiens	Human	-	NP_065944.2	1701	-	-
Pan paniscus	Bonobo	6.6 mya	XP_008972301.1	1703	99%	99%
Capra hircus	Goat	97.5 mya	XP_013821462.1	1746	70%	83%
Physeter cotodon	Sperm whale	97.5 mya	XP_007131156.1	1744	72%	84%
Struthio camelus	Ostrich	320.5 mya	XP_009664045.1	1605	39%	58%
Apteryx australis	Brown kiwi	320.5 mya	XP_013797236.1	1606	40%	60%
Alligator sinensis	Chinese alligator	320.5 mya	XP_006029881.1	1558	40%	59%
Gekko japonicus	Gecko	320.5 mya	XP_015266758.1	1638	40%	58%
Thamnophis sirtalis	Garter snake	320.5 mya	XP_013926700.1	556	41%	56%
Chelonia mydas	Green sea turtle	320.5 mya	XP_007061172.1	1632	45%	68%
Salmo salar	Atlantic salmon	429.6 mya	XP_014027541.1	1488	38%	54%
Lepisosteus oculatus	Spotted gar	429.6 mya	XP_015222467.1	1480	40%	59%
Ciona intestinalis	Sea squirt	733.0 mya	XP_002123678.2	1571	32%	51%
Branchiostoma floridae	Lancelet	733.0 mya	XP_002609423.1	1515	33%	50%
Saccoglossus kowalevskii	Acorn worm	747.8 mya	XP_002742433.1	1523	33%	53%
Priapulida caudatus	Priapulid worm	847.0 mya	XP_014672086.1	1293	28%	46%
Crassostrea gigas	Pacific oyster	847.0 mya	XP_011430927.1	1144	33%	51%
Lottia gigantea	Owl limpet	847.0 mya	XP_009044533.1	886	34%	52%
Lingula anatina	Brachiopod	847.0 mya	XP_013409374.1	1523	35%	53%
Chlamydomonas reinhardtii	Chlamydomonas	1513.9 mya	XP_001694909.1	1544	20%	40%
Salpingoeca rosetta	Choanoflagellate	1724.7 mya	XP_004997848.1	1514	24%	49%

=== Evolutionary history ===
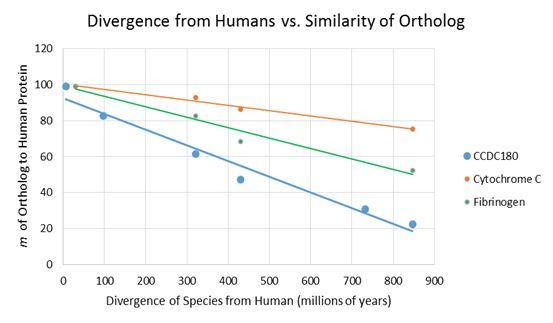
The amino acid changes per 100 (m) in a selection of orthologs of CCDC180 versus time of divergence of the species from human in millions of years. This is compared to Cytochrom C and Fibrinogen to indicate the relatively high speed of evolution of the CCDC180 protein.

CCDC180 is a relatively quickly-evolving gene compared to other well-known genes. There are no known family members, splice variants or isoforms, or evidence of gene duplications in the history of the gene.
