= Acceleration onset cueing =

Aspect of motion platforms in flight simulators

An example of a 6 jack platform showing some movements

Real world - initial acceleration

Platform follows initial acceleration

Platform "washes out" below human motion threshold, then re-sets ready for next acceleration

Acceleration onset cueing is a term for the cueing principle used by a simulator motion platform.

Motion platforms used in "Level D" full flight simulators (FFS) and equivalent military simulators have six jacks that can move the replica cockpit that is mounted on the platform in any of the six degrees of freedom (6 DOF) that can be experienced by any body free to move in space. These are the three rotations pitch (about the transverse axis), roll (about the longitudinal axis) and yaw (about the vertical axis); and the three linear motions heave (up and down), sway (side to side) and surge (fore and aft). The jack layout used is generally that of the so-called Stewart platform, shown in a moving picture on the right and on which the simulator cabin will be mounted.

== Phases ==
Acceleration onset cueing works in three phases:

1. The initial acceleration of the vehicle being simulated is replicated closely by the platform. However, the platform jacks cannot go on moving without reaching their "limit stops" and a technique is used that prevents the stops being reached without being discernible to the simulator crew.
2. After the above initial acceleration, the jack movement is gradually decreased, eventually to zero (this is known as the washout phase).
3. Finally, the motion platform is reset to the neutral position but at a rate below that of the sensory threshold of the simulator crew.

== Human sensing threshold and timescale ==
The various human body motion-sensors react to accelerations rather than steady-state motions and have thresholds below which they do not transmit signals to the brain (the latter explains why instruments are needed for safe cloud flying). Furthermore, impulses from the set of body motion sensors are processed by the brain in a timescale of milliseconds compared to longer time intervals for visual cues of the outside world (OTW) to be registered by the brain. The body motion-sensors include the inner-ear sensors, (semicircular canals and otoliths, the "vestibular sensors"), the muscle-and joint sensors, and sensors that register movements and pressures on body parts such as arms, legs and buttocks.

== Simulator sickness ==
In the real world the brain is (subconsciously) expecting to receive the above motion cues before later registering the associated change in the visual scene. In a simulator, if motion cues are not present to back up visual cues, disorientation can result ("simulator sickness") due to the cue-mismatch compared to the real world.

The above way the body signals motion to the brain coincides very well with acceleration-onset cueing in a simulator. This is the reason why well-designed and properly set-up modern low-latency motion platforms in simulators work well for all aircraft from large transports to the low-g-force envelope of fighter aircraft.

== Impact on simulator suitability ==
Because fighter aircraft are capable of high-g, which cannot be modelled by a 6-jack motion platform, the majority of fighter simulators are not equipped with motion platforms.

In contrast, civil airliner full flight simulators to the international Level D/Type 7 standard must have a 6-axis platform, and many military simulators for large aircraft and helicopters follow the civil Level D/Type 7 design.

== See also ==
- Latency (engineering)
