= TRU Simulation + Training =

American aviation simulation company

TRU Simulation + Training Inc.
- Industry: Flight simulation
- Predecessors: Mechtronix Inc.; OPINICUS Corporation; ProFlight; Textron Systems AAI (partially)
- Founded: 2014; 12 years ago
- Headquarters: Tampa, Florida, United States
- Key people: Gerald Messaris, President & CEO[7]
- Parent: Textron Inc.
- Website: www.trusimulation.com

TRU Simulation + Training (TRU, usually pronounced as in "true") is an American manufacturer of flight simulators and training devices for civil and military markets. It is a subsidiary of Textron and was formed in 2014 when previously acquired simulator manufacturers Mechtronix and OPINICUS were merged with part of the Textron Systems division. A further company, business jet training provider ProFlight, was acquired and merged later that year.

In 2014, TRU was selected by Boeing for the development and supply of a 737 MAX full flight training suite, and two years later the company secured a 10-year agreement for a similar product for the newly developed 777X.

In November 2020, Textron sold the non-US based civil aviation business (the former Mechtronix sites in Montreal) to Canadian simulator manufacturer CAE. The move followed TRU's decision in July of the same year to wind down the commercial air transport simulation business to focus instead on the business aviation, rotorcraft, and military simulation markets.
