= Unmanned aircraft system simulation =

Simulation focusing on training pilots to control an unmanned aircraft

Unmanned aircraft system simulation focuses on training pilots (or operators) to control an unmanned aircraft or its payload from a control station. Flight simulation involves a device that artificially re-creates aircraft flight and the environment in which it flies for pilot training, design, or other purposes. It includes replicating the equations that govern how aircraft fly, how they react to applications of flight controls, the effects of other aircraft systems, and how the aircraft reacts to external factors such as air density, turbulence, wind shear, cloud, precipitation, etc.

Manned simulation is used for a variety of reasons, including flight training (mainly of pilots), the design and development of the aircraft itself, and research into aircraft characteristics and control handling qualities. Unlike manned simulation, unmanned aircraft system (UAS) simulation does not involve a pilot aboard the training device.

== Unmanned Aircraft System (UAS) Simulation Training ==
Manned flight simulators employ various types of hardware and software, depending on the modeling detail and realism that is required for the role in which they are to be employed. Designs range from PC laptop-based models of aircraft systems (called Part Task Trainers or PTTs), to replica cockpits for initial familiarization, to highly realistic simulations of the cockpit, flight controls and aircraft systems for more complete pilot training.

The use of unmanned systems by defense forces globally has grown substantially over the past decade, and is only expected to continue to grow significantly. In addition, unmanned systems will be used increasingly for commercial applications such as remote inspection of pipelines and hydroelectric installations, surveillance of forest fires, observation of critical natural resources, assessing natural disasters and a range of other applications. This increase in the use of UAS capabilities results in the need to have more highly skilled UAS pilots, sensor operators, and mission commanders.

An unmanned aerial vehicle (UAV), commonly known as a drone and referred to as a Remotely Piloted Aircraft (RPA) by the International Civil Aviation Organization (ICAO), is an aircraft without a human pilot aboard. Its flight is controlled either autonomously by onboard computers or by the remote control of a pilot on the ground or in another vehicle. The typical launch and recovery method of an unmanned aircraft is by the function of an automatic system or an external operator on the ground. Historically, UAVs were simple remotely piloted aircraft, but autonomous control is increasingly being employed. A UAS is composed of the UAV, itself, as well as associated launch, recovery, and control hardware and software.

UAVs are usually deployed for military and special operation applications, but are also used in a small but growing number of civil applications, such as policing and firefighting, and nonmilitary security work such as surveillance of pipelines. UAVs are often preferred for missions that are too "dull, dirty or dangerous" for manned aircraft.

UAS Simulation Training allows UAV operators to train in real-time to operate UAVs in a virtual environment that is realistic and accurate, but without the risks and constraints of a real flight. UAS simulation includes:

- Simulated UAVS: The system allows training on both helicopter and fixed wing UAVs.
- Training with the actual ground station: The system uses real data generated by the actual UAV autopilot to provide an extremely realistic simulation.
- The virtual world in which the UAV flies is modeled in 3D with photo textures, and contains all the necessary features to simulate a mission in operational conditions.
- Payload simulation: The system generates real-time video to simulate the payload output in both visible and IR modes. This video is piped to the actual video station as in the real system.
- Simulation features: Multilingual interface, VCR type controls (replay forward / backward), Simulated weather functions, display options (flight panel, UAV trajectory), display of telemetry data.

UAS Simulation Training combines an open architecture with commercial-off-the-shelf hardware and simulation software that helps the use of proprietary designs to provide a comprehensive, platform-agnostic training system. Customers benefit from greater flexibility for evolution, networking, distributed mission training and combination within an integrated training environment. UAS is a solution that optimizes operational readiness while minimizing the use of live assets to train and prepare the integrated mission team for operations. The comprehensive solution also prepares the integrated mission team (pilot, payload specialist, and commanding officer) in platform operating procedures, data interpretation and analysis, and team interaction.

== UAS Training in the United States Armed Forces ==
Potential Air Force UAS pilots and sensor operators attend three and a half months of specialized training courses, most of which is simulated. In simulated training for the Predator, operators use a manual control stick, rudder system and monitor system that is the same as the live simulator. The Air Force's primary UAS training bases are at Holloman Air Force Base, NM, Cannon AFB, NM, Ellsworth AFB, SD, and Whiteman AFB, MO, but will take initial flight training in Pueblo, CO.

Army soldiers receive training on smaller, easier to maneuver UAS, such as the Raven and Puma, from master trainers. Master trainers are selected from bases around the world and are given instruction at Ft. Benning, GA. These master trainers then train units at their home base. Army operators for larger UAS, such as the Shadow and Gray Eagle, conduct training in Fort Huachuca, AZ because of its remote location. These operators are UAS fight specialist for a single specific model. This is due to the different capabilities and functions of each air craft. Training is a combination of live and simulated training to teach new operators. Training is easily simulated because it is almost the same experience as live training in the aircraft that is operated by a Ground Control Station (GCS).

The standard for the Navy was to use pilots who have completed at least one piloting tour before allowing training in operating a UAS. With the advancement and economy of simulators, the Navy is beginning to train enlisted personnel with flight experience to become operators. Capt. Patrick Smith, a Fire Scout program manager was quoted to state, “Ideally, we take [potential operators] from the SH-60 SeaHawk community and add them to the five-week program, mainly simulator-based." The Navy conducts UAS training in Ft. Huachuca, AZ for live simulation or military installations near Patuxent River, MD for the Fire Scouts.

In 2014, Marines that complete the Basic School Officer course in Quantico, VA, will have taken training in small UAS (Raven and Puma). UAS are not widely used in the Marines, but as the UAS become smaller and more mobile, they will become more integrated in mission resources. Marines recently started to receive training from the Group I (under 20 pounds) UAS Training and Logistics Support Activity in Camp Lejeune, NC.

UAS in inventory for each branch of service:

- Air Force: MQ-1 Predator, MQ-9 Reaper, and RQ-4 Global Hawk.
- Army: RQ-11 Raven, RQ-7 Shadow, RQ-5 Hunter, MQ-1C Gray Eagle and RQ-20 Puma.
- Navy: BAMS, Firescout/VTUAV, STUAS, Scan Eagle, and UCASS UAS. The UCASS was scheduled to be replaced by the UCLASS in fiscal year 2015.
- Marine Corps: RQ-7 Shadow and STUAS.

== UAS Training in Domestic/Civil Sectors ==
Firefighters, police, miners, and weather researchers are now using UAVs (commonly referred to as drones), which were first used in military sectors. The drones used by police and firefighters are the same type of drones; however, they are used for different purposes. UAVs have gone beyond the human capacity of lifting heavy loads, performing daring photography amidst a heavy storm, and digitizing images that can be converted into 3D maps.

Weather researchers use different drones to help predict weather, photograph storms and measure temperature. Drones are very essential for weather crews in predicting wind speed and temperature, wind direction, air temperature and pressure (Aerosonde Mark 4). Other drones are used for taking images of storm systems, even inside the storm itself. Like the Mark 4, NASA's Global Hawk is used to measure air temperature, wind speed, and pressure, but unlike the Mark 4, it can take images of the storm system.

In mining, drones help miners with tasks such as inspection and maintenance, carrying heavy equipment, and even carrying out tasks 24 hours a day/7 days a week. The mining industry uses drones such as Responder and Serenity to assist mining crews with maintenance, inspection, and imagery. Some drones within the mining industry assist workers with photography of the sediments to be mined so it can be calculated in terms of volume for removal and the stockpile of sediment graded by workers.

In police forces, drones are used for bomb detonation, response to incidents, pursuing criminals in the air, and determining a suspect's location using high tech camera systems (Viking 400-S). Other uses for drones in police sectors are to record incidents, create maps of the incidents in 3D models, and then later send them to officers’ smart phones (Sensefly eBee). Other drones, such as the Kaman drop supplies and equipment for officers, as well as transport officers to and back from the crime scene. The E300 is used to stop criminals and record an incident.

Firefighters use the same drones, but for different purposes. For example, ELIMCO's E300 is used to put out fires, the Viking 400-S uses a camera to photograph incidents, then later transmits the images back to firefighting personnel for mapping the incidents electronically. The Information Processing Systems’ MCV, like the E300 is used for putting out wildfires and man-made fires. The eBee, like its police variant takes photographs with a 16 MP camera, which is used to create 3D models of maps through integrating technology from Google Maps. It is later sent to firefighting personnel smart phones. The Kaman, like its police variant, is used to supply firefighters and victims of fires, and to provide medical assistance. The Defikopter sends defibrillators to victims of heart attack. To locate a victim, it uses a GPS system.

== UAS Training in Higher Education ==
There are two primary roles or purposes for UAS in higher education:

- Training and certification of UAS operators
- UAS-related research

=== Specific UAS Applications by School ===
At the University of North Dakota (UND) Bachelor of Science in Aeronautics program, simulators are used for both operator certification and research purposes. For operator certification, UND uses Original Equipment Manufacturer (OEM) simulators specific to a particular vehicle (e.g., ScanEagle, MQ-8, etc.). Actual qualification training is on hold until the Federal Aviation Administration (FAA) puts standards in place for the use of UAS in United States airspace. However, students can learn basic operation principles and how UAS will function in national airspace. UND also conducts research funded by the Air Force Research Laboratory on task loading of UAS operators. This research compares single operators versus multi-operator crews and full auto-piloted systems versus remotely piloted systems.

Embry-Riddle Aeronautical University in Daytona Beach, FL uses simulators in an undergraduate UAS operator program awarding a Bachelor of Science degree in Unmanned Aircraft Systems Science. Primarily, this program trains UAS operators, but it also serves a research role to test the application of UAS in national airspace.

Several other schools offer non-engineering based UAS undergraduate programs, of which simulators are an integral part. Some examples include:

- Indiana State University: Minor in Unmanned Systems
- Kansas State University – Salina: Bachelor of Science in Unmanned Aircraft Systems
- Oklahoma State University: UAS option for MS or PhD degrees in Mechanical and Aerospace Engineering

== Agent based Modeling and Simulation of UAS ==
UAV Simulators generally focus on low-level flight control and coordination by using complex physics-based models that are geared towards accuracy. These simulators requires domain expertise and complex knowledge to build, learn and operate the simulator itself. Alternate simulators are being developed such as Agent Based Modeling and Simulation for UAS, especially by military.

Agent based modeling and simulation of UAV focuses on specialized issues such as coordination and planning. For example, the CoUAV. simulator focuses on cooperative search and MAS-Planes focuses on request servicing by decentralized coordination. Agent based simulation has also been used for UAV flight dynamic simulation modeling.

Agent based modeling and simulation has been used for managing missions for UAS. The authors used Codarra Avatar for their experiments. Codarra Avatar is a lightweight UAV which has been specifically built for small-scale reconnaissance and surveillance missions. This UAV can be assembled and disassembled very quickly and transported in a backpack. However, in becoming an autonomous UAV, the Codarra Avatar faces challenges of flight time, flight range, durability, limited computational power, limited sensory data, and flight regulations and restrictions. The authors developed Agent-Flight Control System Architecture (FCS) to combat the issues faced with the UAV.

FCS has an agent that sits at the top of a control tree, receives data at regular intervals, and issues high level waypoint commands. The agent is designed in JACK, an agent-oriented programming language. The behavior of agents defined using JACK are structured around the BDI (Belief, Desire, Intentions) theory of agency. The mission Management System is designed using the OODA (Observe, Orient, Decide, Act) Approach that was developed by Colonel John Boyd. Authors conducted successful tests in Melbourne, Australia, using an FCS Architecture on the Codarra Avatar UAV.
