= Camp Paxson Boy Scout Camp =

- Camp Paxson Boy Scout Camp (24MO77)
- U.S. National Register of Historic Places
- Location within Montana Location within the United States
- Location: Seeley Lake, Lolo National Forest, Montana
- Coordinates: 47°11′14″N 113°31′4″W
- Area: 6.7 acres (2.7 ha)
- Built: 1939
- Architect: Civilian Conservation Corps, Clyde Fickes
- Architectural style: Log Construction
- NRHP reference No.: 86000584
- Added to NRHP: March 21, 1986

Camp Paxson Boy Scout Camp, located on the western shore of Seeley Lake, Lolo National Forest, Montana, is on the National Register of Historic Places. It started out as a summer camp for the Boy Scouts of America (BSA), and is named in honor of Montana western painter Edgar Samuel Paxson. The United States Forest Service granted the Western Montana Council of the BSA permission to build a summer camp, originally with six small 12x24' clapboard structures and tents on just 4 acres (1.6 ha), in 1924. The camp was expanded beginning in October 1939, with more facilities constructed by the Works Progress Administration and Civilian Conservation Corps (CCC). The camp was completed in 1940 on 6.7 acres (2.7 ha) under the supervision of Forest Service engineer Clyde Fickes.

== Background ==
There are twenty buildings constructed out of notched Western Larch logs: a dining hall, 15 sleeping cabins, two bathhouses, and caretaker facilities. Uncut native stone was used for the fireplaces. The camp was ready for the summer season in 1940. However, about 1941–1942 The Boy Scouts moved their camp to Melita Island on Flathead Lake.

The site was used by the United States Forest Service as a smokejumper school for conscientious objectors in the Civilian Public Service Program during World War II. This smokejumper program operated from May 1943 to April 1946 under the name "CPS Camp No. 103". It is the only CCC-constructed youth camp in Montana. Campfire Girls, Girl Scouts, Jaycees, 4-H, the Seventh Day Adventist Church, and various civic and religious organizations have used the camp. The Montana Conservation Corps, modeled on the CCC, holds its first week of training here each year. The site became a training camp for the Missoula Children's Theatre in 1995 and now has 15 acres (6.1 ha). It is also used for activities such as family reunions and weddings.

Camp in the 30s and 40s

== See also ==
- National Register of Historic Places listings in Missoula County, Montana
