= Full flight simulator =

Category of flight simulator

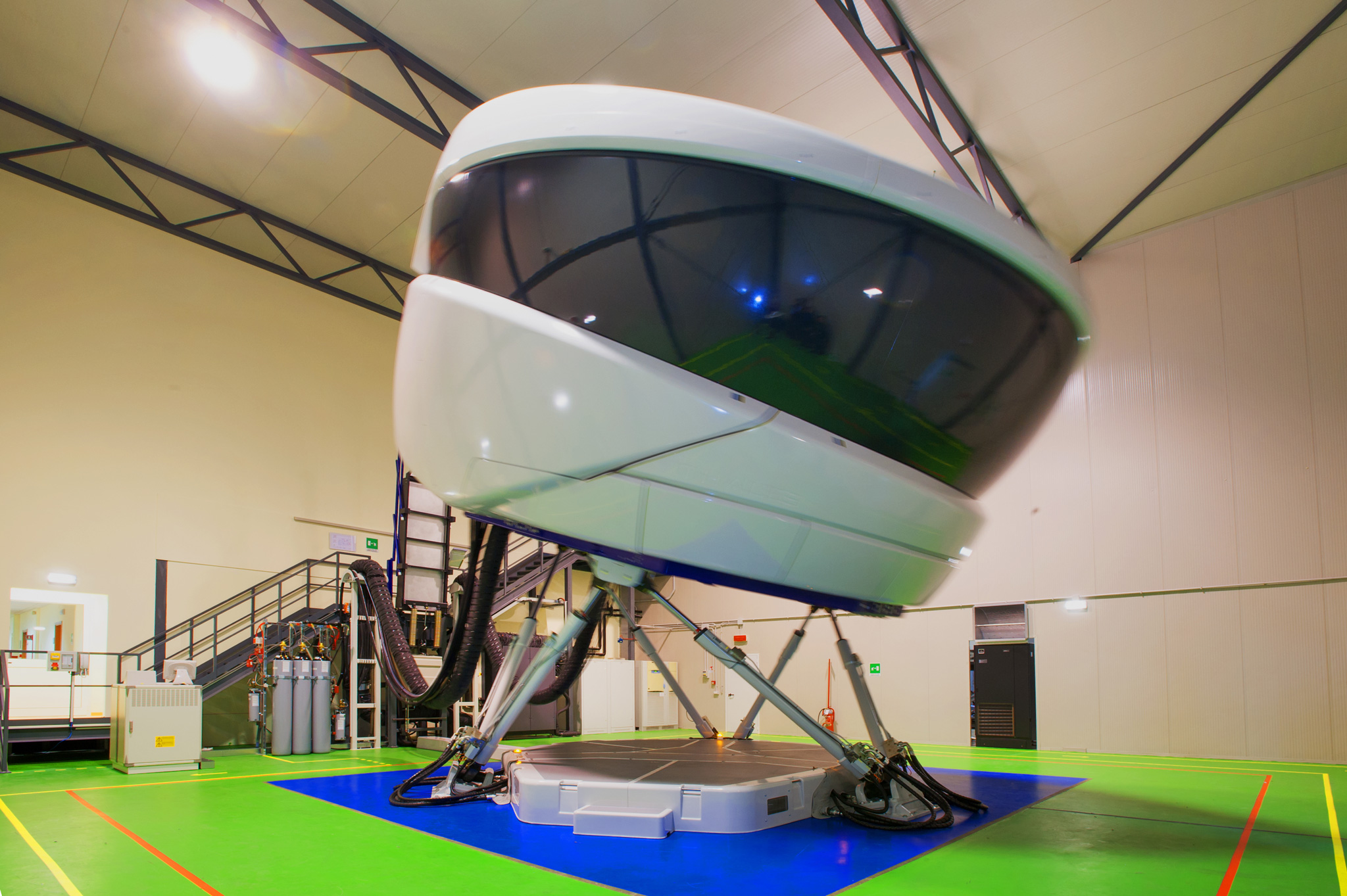
A Sukhoi SuperJet full flight simulator

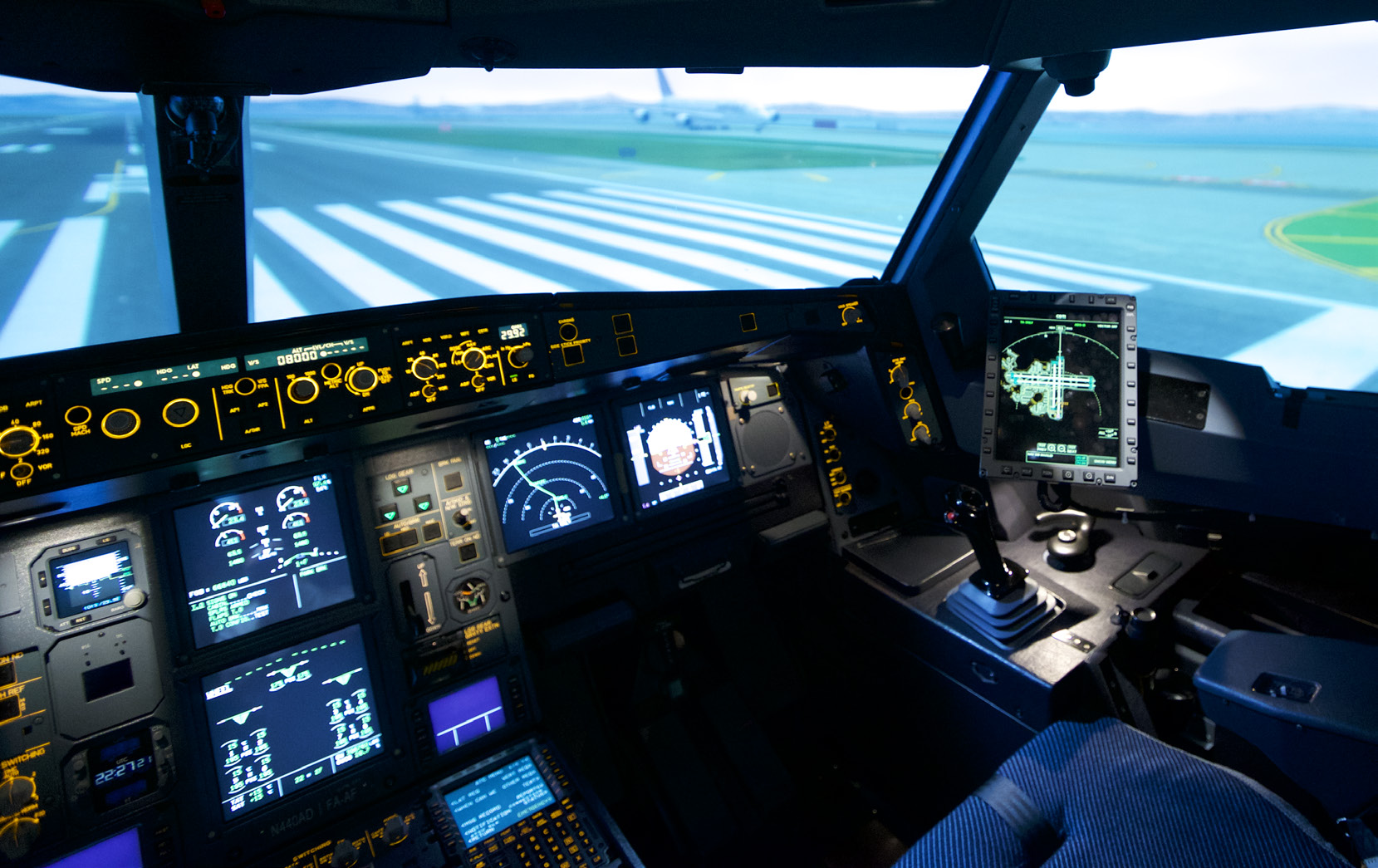
The interior of an Airbus full flight simulator

Full flight simulator (FFS) is a term used by national (civil) aviation authorities (NAA) for a high technical level of flight simulator. Such authorities include the Federal Aviation Administration (FAA) in the United States and the European Aviation Safety Agency (EASA).

There are currently four levels of full flight simulator, levels A through D, with level D being the highest standard and being eligible for zero flight time (ZFT) training of civil pilots when converting from one airliner type to another. In about 2012, these FFS levels will be changed as a result of work by an international working group chaired by the UK Royal Aeronautical Society Flight Simulation Group (RAeS FSG), which rationalised 27 previous categories of flight training device into 7 international ones. This work has been accepted by ICAO and is published under ICAO document 9625 Issue 3. The new Type 7 Full Flight Simulator will be the old Level D with enhancements in a number of areas including motion, visual and Communications/air traffic simulations.

A Level D/Type 7 simulator simulates all aircraft systems that are accessible from the flight deck and are critical to training. For instance, accurate force feedback for the pilot's flight controls is provided through a simulator system called "control loading", and other systems such as avionics, communications and "glass cockpit" displays are also simulated.

This standard of simulator is used both for initial and recurrent training for commercial air transport (CAT) aircraft. Initial training is for conversion to a new aircraft type, and recurrent training is that which all commercial pilots must carry out at regular intervals (such as every six months) in order to retain their qualification to fly "fare-paying passengers" in CAT aircraft, loosely "airliners".

A Level D/Type 7 FFS also provides motion feedback to the crew through a motion platform upon which the simulator cabin is mounted. The motion platform must produce accelerations in all of the six degrees of freedom (6-DoF) that can be experienced by a body that is free to move in space, using a principle called acceleration onset cueing, generally using the Stewart platform design.

== Visual system ==
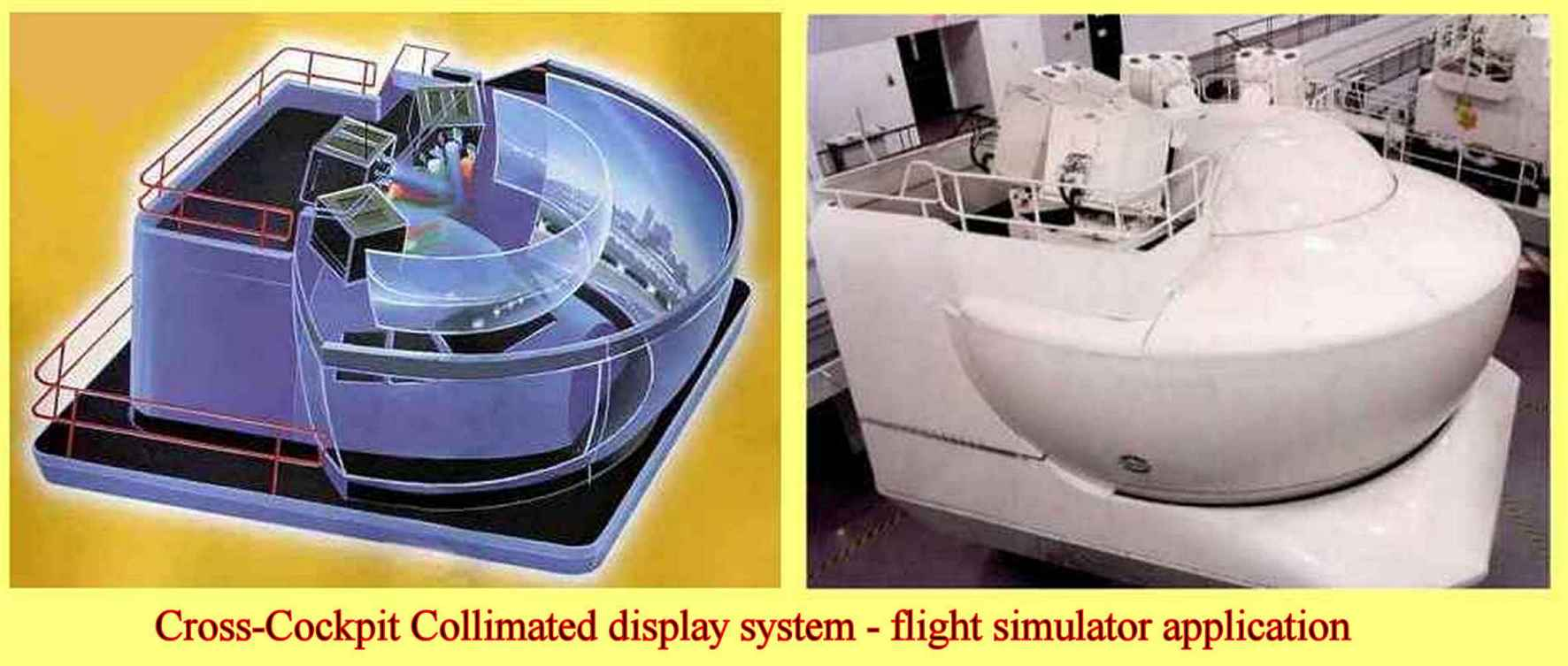

Visual systems of full flight simulators are typically based on the cross-cockpit collimated display concept, in which the computer-generated out-the-window view is projected on the back of a translucent screen. The image that forms on the other side is then reflected by a curved mirror that extends around the entire cockpit, providing a field of view that can reach 200° horizontally and 40° vertically. The collimating design of the mirror gives the occupants a realistic impression of three-dimensionality when looking at distant objects.

== See also ==
- Index of aviation articles
- Latency (engineering)
- Simulator ride
- Ames Research Center
