= Edgar Samuel Paxson =

American painter (1852–1919)

Edgar S. Paxson
- Born: April 25, 1852; East Hamburg, New York
- Died: November 9, 1919 (aged 67); Missoula, Montana
- Known for: Painting
- Spouse: Laura Millicent Johnson

Edgar Samuel Paxson (April 25, 1852 – November 9, 1919) was an American frontier painter, scout, soldier and writer, based mainly in Montana. He is best known for his portraits of Native Americans in the Old West and for his depiction of the Battle of Little Bighorn in his painting "Custer's Last Stand".

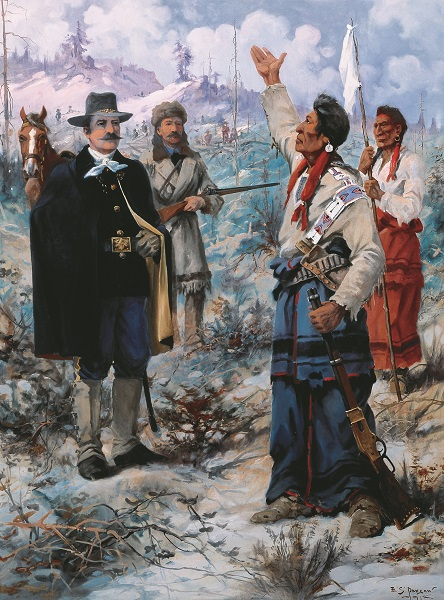
"Surrender of Chief Joseph", Montana Capitol

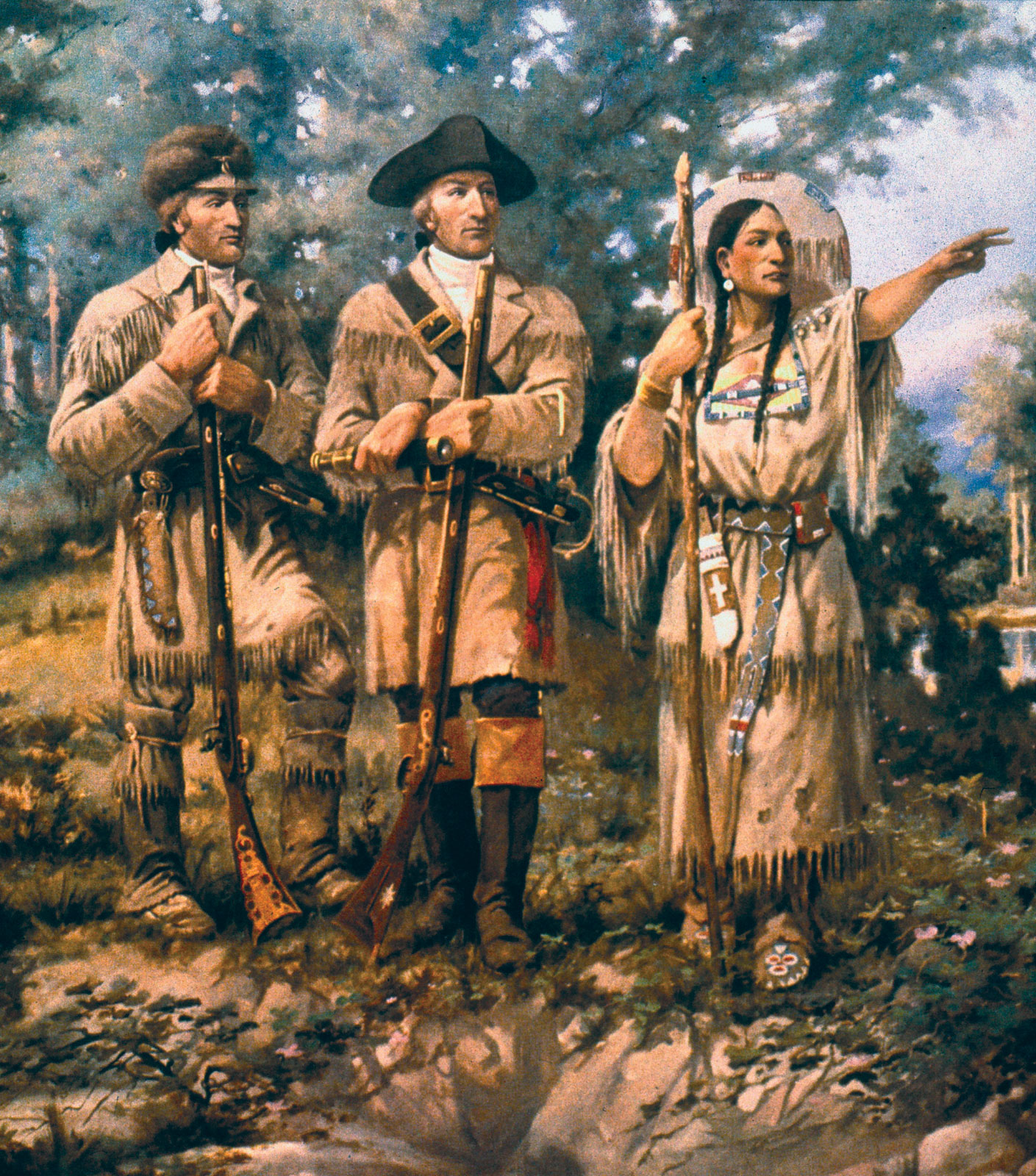
Detail of "Lewis and Clark at Three Forks", Montana Capitol

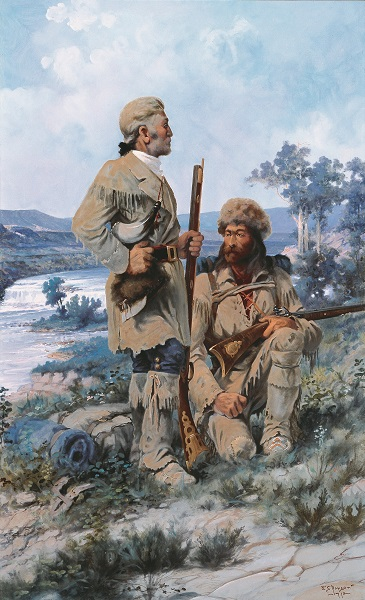
"Lewis at Black Eagle Falls," Montana Capitol

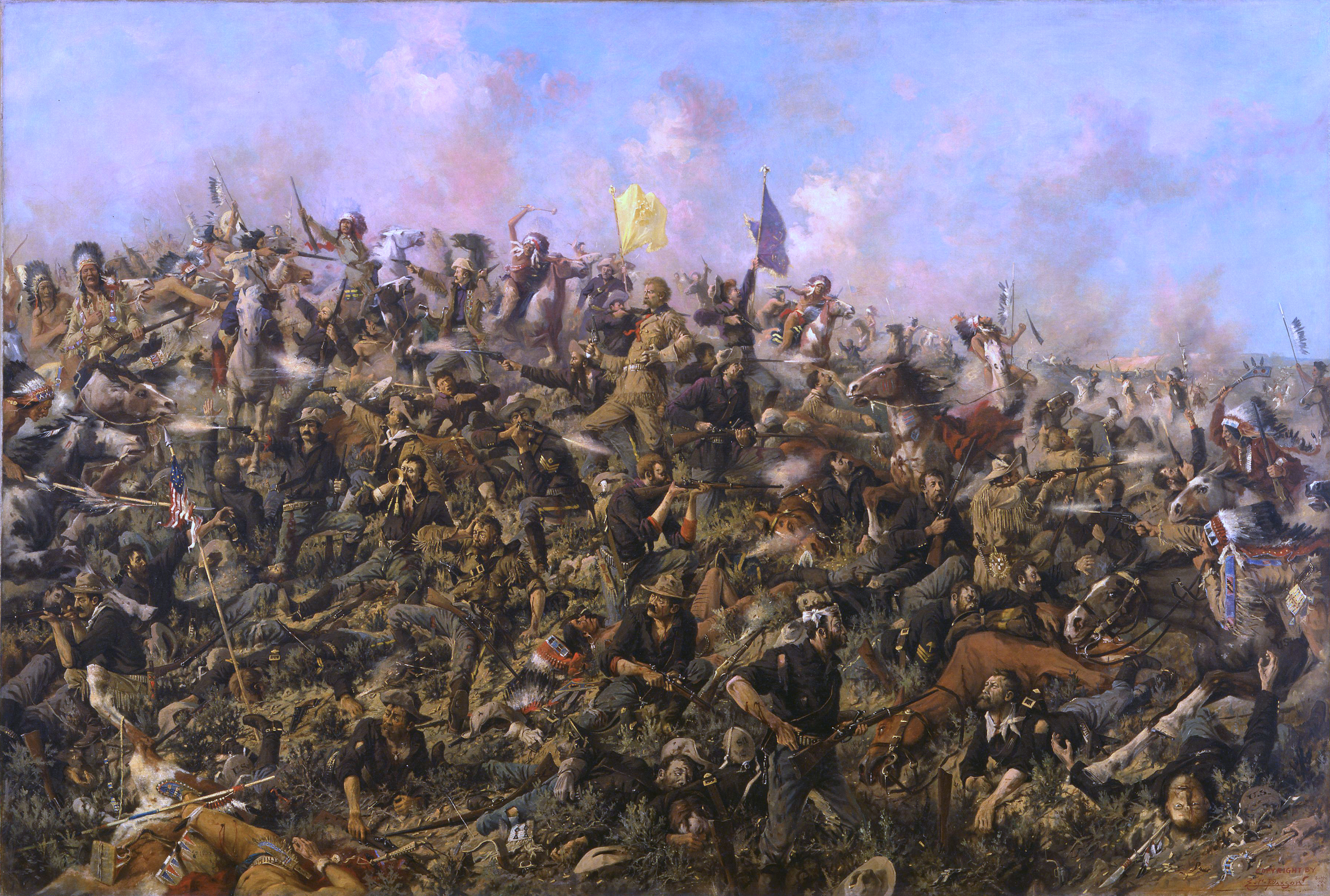
Custer's Last Stand

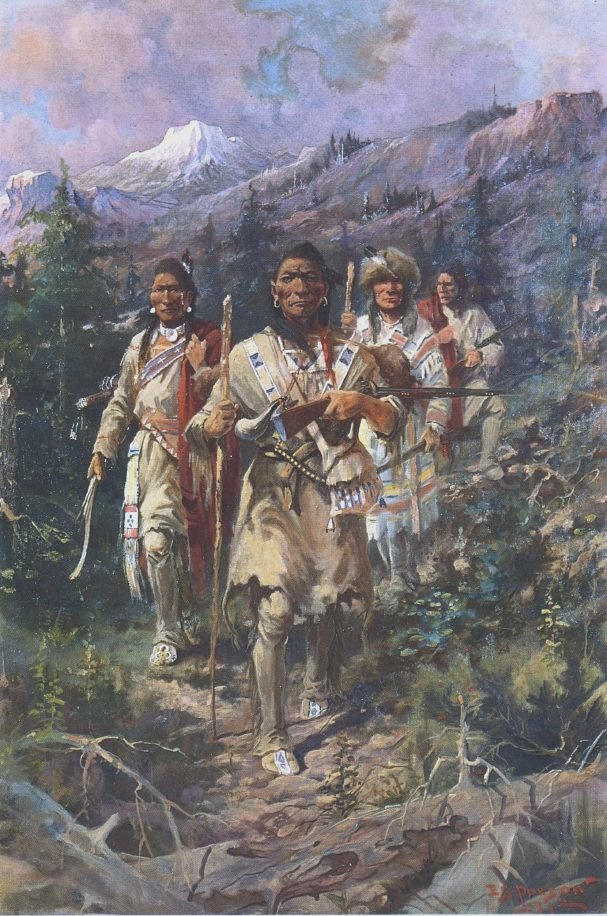
"After the Whiteman's Book," Montana Capitol

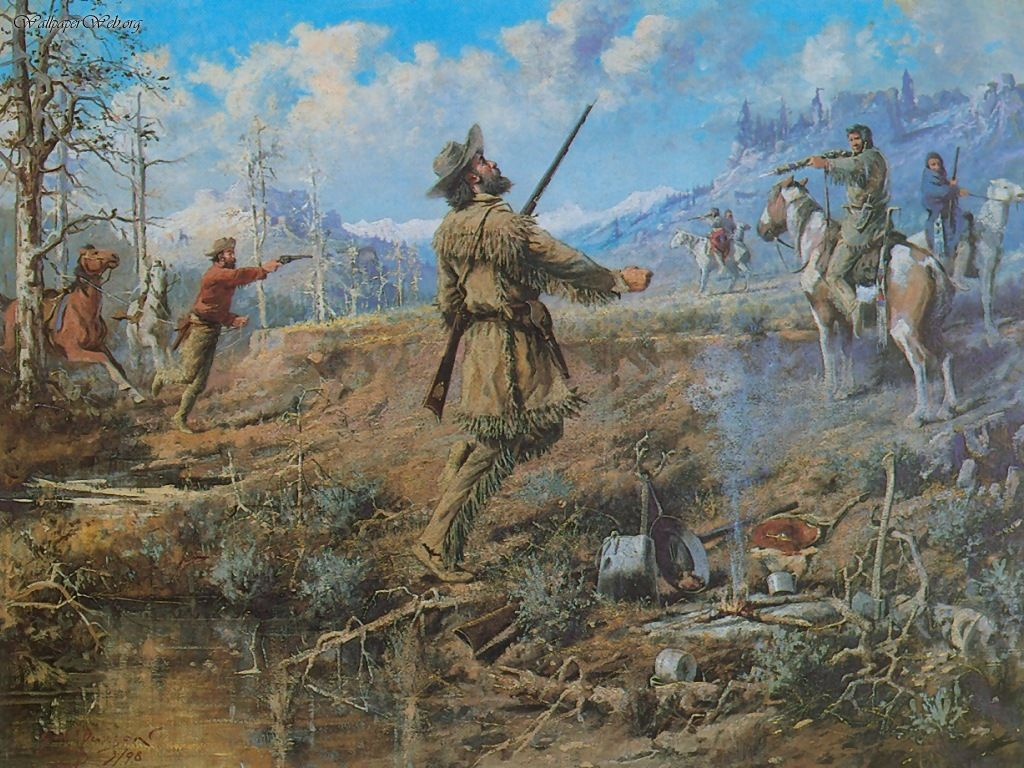
The Death Of John Bozeman by Edgar Samuel Paxson

== Biography ==
Paxson was born in 1852 to a Quaker family in East Hamburg New York. He spent most of his childhood in the woodlands of New York and Pennsylvania, learning to hunt and trap game with the help of his uncles. At age ten he worked as a drummer boy for new recruits during the American Civil War. His urge to explore the American frontier was fostered by uncles who had traveled west for the California Gold Rush, returning with stories of Indians, dangerous wildlife, and the harsh trek across America, and from family friends who lived in the New York frontier when the Seneca Nation ranged the woodlands. Inspired by his meetings with Kit Carson and Captain Jack Crawford (the "Poet Scout") in New York, he became restless to explore and by age 20 was travelling across America, ranging from Kansas to Canada. Eventually he made a home in Deer Lodge, Montana with his wife Laura Millicent and child Loren.

Once settled in Deer Lodge, Paxson began to take work painting signage, and then painting stage sets for the Cottonwood Theater in Deer Lodge. He lived comfortably in Deer Lodge, still relatively obscure as an artist, raising his four children with Laura, until the Spanish–American War in 1898, when at age 46 he led Company "G"of the Butte Volunteers into battle in the jungles of Manila. Camp Paxson, a National Registered Historic Place, is named in his honor.

== Custer's Last Stand ==
=== Inspiration ===
Paxson repeatedly stated in interviews that his initial spark of inspiration to take to the canvas was inspired by the violence and drama of the Battle of Little Bighorn, and by the character of George Armstrong Custer. The battle had taken place as he made his way west to Montana, and stayed with him as a reminder of the brutality and tragedy of the Old West.

=== Research ===
He started researching the battle shortly after arriving in Montana, interviewing Indians who had participated in it and soldiers who had first arrived on the scene. Having built a good reputation with both American soldiers and many Native American tribes, he was able to interview parties from both sides, including a Sioux chief named Gall, a Cheyenne warrior named Two Moon, and Brigadier General Edward Settle Godfrey. From their interviews he made detailed journals about the equipment, attire, and physical location of each man on the battlefield. Individual figure studies of each man on the battlefield were made, and he created in pen and ink a scaled down version to outline the figures.

=== Reaction ===
It took Paxson six years to complete the painting which he allowed an associate to take on tour around America, charging twenty-five cents to view it. Brigadier General Edward Settle Godfrey was brought to tears by the accuracy and ferocity of the painting, as was Elizabeth Custer. In 1963 Harold McCracken, the noted historian and Western art authority, deemed Paxson's painting "the best pictoral representation of the battle" and "from a purely artistic standpoint...one of the best if not the finest pictures which have been created to immortalize that dramatic event." The painting can now be found in the Buffalo Bill Center of the West, in Cody, Wyoming.

== Public murals ==
In 1912 Paxson was commissioned to paint eight murals in the Missoula, Montana county courthouse. The murals took 16 months to complete, and still stand in the entrance hall where they were originally placed. The subjects include Sacagawea, and the journey of Lewis and Clark. He also created six scenes depicting significant events in early Montana History for the House of Representatives Lobby in the Montana State Capitol.

== Friendship With Charlie Russell ==
Edgar and fellow Montanan, Charles Marion Russell met in 1908, and Russell later visited Paxson's Missoula studio. These two artists had an amicable relationship. In 1915, they marshaled a parade together in downtown Missoula. But the two artists are often compared, at Paxson's expense. A careful look reveals that their styles and interests were distinct and both of their visions enrich our understanding of frontier culture. Russell was recognized for his renditions of the cowboys and range land of the central and eastern parts of the state. Paxson, on the other hand, was much more intrigued with the mountainous western Montana landscape and its inhabitants of fur trappers and Native Americans. Paxson was often praised for his attention to historic detail, as opposed to perhaps a more romantic view of the untamed west. His murals at the Missoula County Courthouse and the State Capitol depict scenes largely faithful to the historic record. They include events such as stops on the Lewis and Clark journey, the signing of the treaty at Council Grove, and the journey of the Salish out of the Bitterroot Valley.

Following Paxson's death, Russell offered a tribute to the artist: "Paxson has gone, but his pictures will not allow us to forget him. His work tells me that he loved the Old West, and those that love her I count as friends. Paxson was my friend, and today the west that he knew is history that lives in books. His brush told stories that people like to read. … The iron heel of civilization has stamped out nations of men, but it has never been able to stamp out pictures, and Paxson was one of the men gifted to make them. I am a painter, too, but Paxson has done some things that I cannot do. He was a pioneer and a pioneer painter … Paxson loved Montana. May the land where he has gone be even more beautiful than the mountains that he loved."
