= Mechtronix =

Mechtronix Inc.
- Company type: Private
- Industry: Aerospace, Flight Simulation
- Founded: 1987
- Headquarters: Montreal, Quebec, Canada
- Key people: Fernando Petruzziello, Joaquim Frazao, Thom Allen, Marco Petruzziello
- Products: Full Flight Simulator, FTD, Flight Training Equipment, FSTD, Commercial Aviation Training, General Aviation Training, Business Aviation Training
- Number of employees: 300
- Website: www.mechtronix.com

Mechtronix Inc. was a Canadian company specializing in the manufacture of flight simulation training devices (FSTD) for commercial, general, and business aviation. The company was founded in 1987 and was based in Montreal, Canada. The company was acquired by Textron in 2013 and was merged into TRU Simulation + Training.

== History ==
Mechtronix Inc. was founded at Concordia University, as an engineering consultancy group specializing in microprocessor industrial applications.

== Products & Services ==
Mechtronix manufactures a line of training devices for general, business, and commercial aviation. The product family includes Full Flight Simulators Level D, FNPTs (Flight and Navigation Procedures Trainers), and FTDs (Flight Training Devices). Mechtronix also manufactures products such as the FFT X, an exact replica of the FFS without a motion base. Mechtronix simulated aircraft range from small single-engine training airplanes, such as the Cessna 172 to commercial airplanes, such as the Boeing 737, Airbus 320 & 330, ATR 42/72.

== Awards ==
Mechtronix has received numerous appraisals and awards for its products. some examples are,.

- Les Mercuriades - Fédération des chambres de commerce du Québec
- Business of the Year (2007)
- Export Award (2007)
- Innovation Award (2006)
