= Montana Conservation Corps =

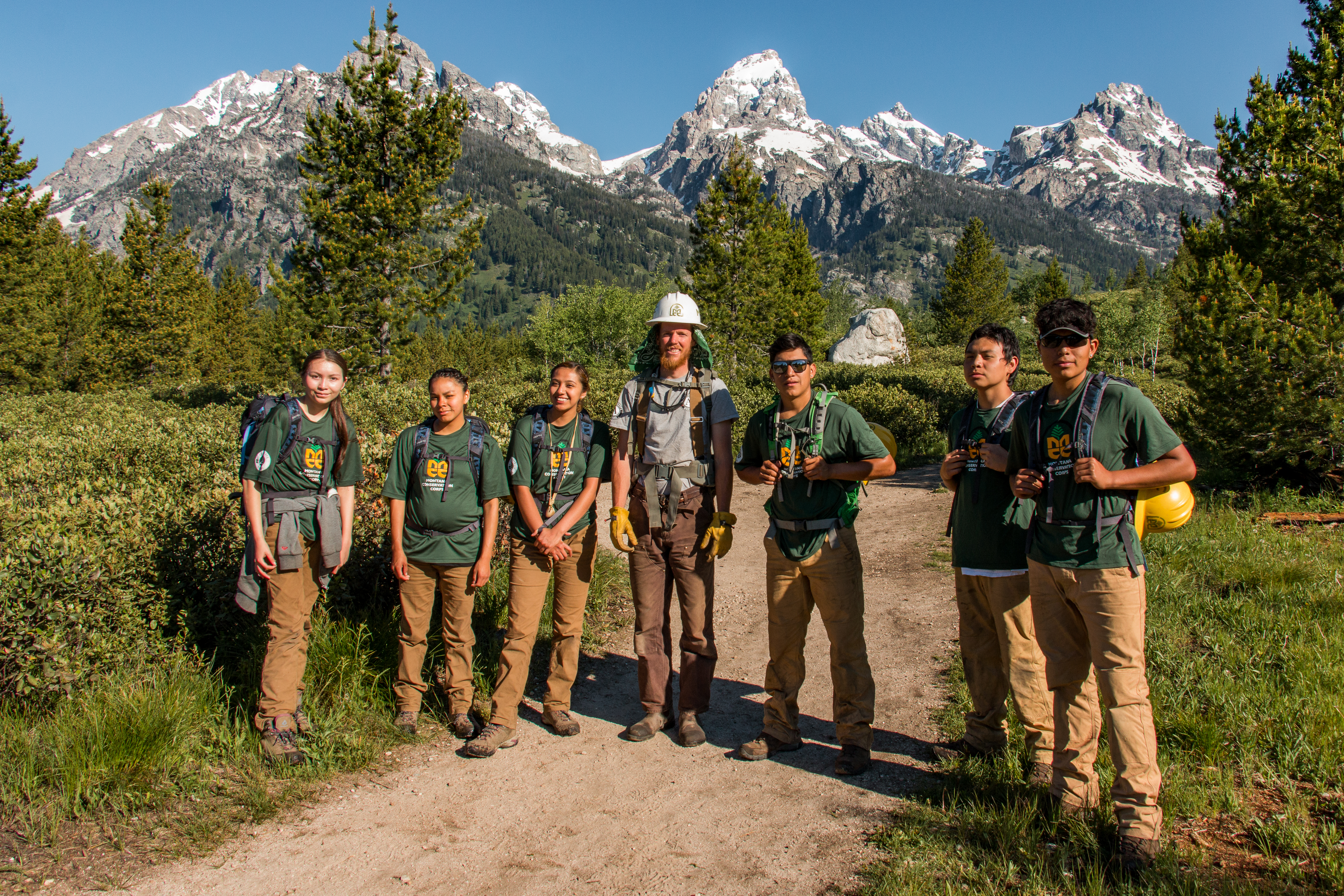
Montana Conservation Corps Youth

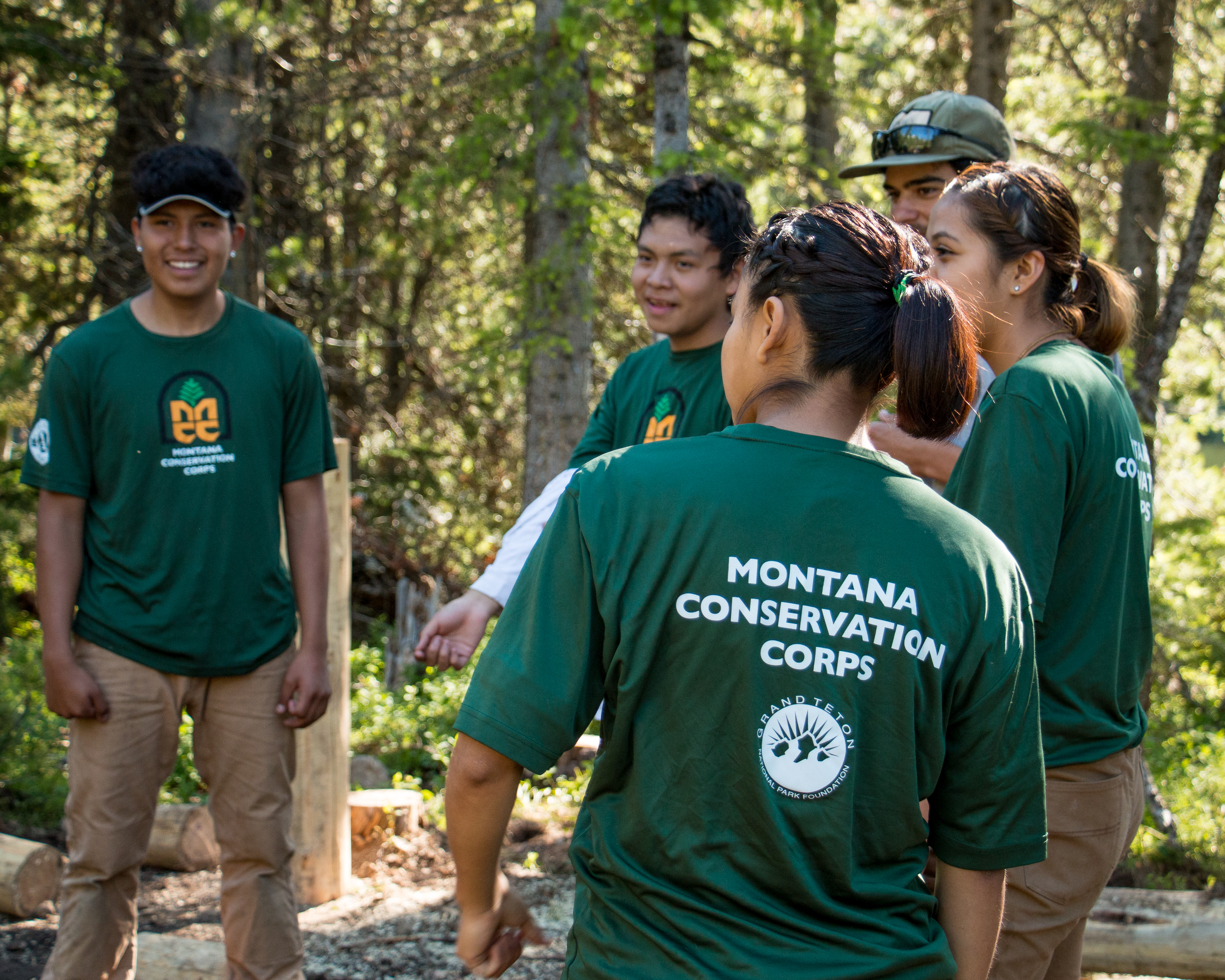
Montana Conservation Corps Youth

The Montana Conservation Corps (MCC) is a young adult voluntary development program modeled after the Civilian Conservation Corps of the 1930s, using conservation projects to foster citizenship and personal growth in its members. The MCC operates crews in four towns throughout Montana: Missoula, Kalispell, Helena, and Bozeman. In addition MCC's central office is located in Bozeman.

== Overview ==
MCC projects, or "hitches", take the form of trail construction and maintenance, fencing, noxious weed control, habitat restoration, tree planting, fuels reduction, historical building renovation, and campground improvements. Working for Montana state agencies and federal agencies such as the National Park Service, the U.S. Forest Service, and the Bureau of Land Management, members not only have the opportunity to develop vocational and interpersonal skills but also spend their summer amid the landscapes of Montana, Idaho, Wyoming, and North Dakota.

MCC crews are managed by a pair of co-leaders and consist of four to five Corpsmembers, all of whom are also AmeriCorps volunteers. The Crew Leader terms last from February to November, while the Corpsmember terms last from May to October. Those who join the MCC come from assorted backgrounds: college graduates; Peace Corps graduates; other AmeriCorps Programs; environmental educators; individuals who want to work with the Forest Service or Park Service; and individuals who want to do something different with their lives.

In addition to field crews, the MCC also serves Montana teens with its Youth Service Expedition program. Expedition crew members volunteer on conservation projects for four weeks during the summer and receive a monetary award upon completion. Camp Paxson is one of the places where training occurs.

MCC also serves OEF and OIF veterans with its Veterans Green Corps (VGC) program. VGC members complete a conservation job skills training program with the end goal of pursuing employment with public land agencies.

MCC is part of the Big Sky Watershed Corps partnership (BSWC). BSWC members assist communities in watershed health and conservation.

== Mission statement ==
"To inspire young people through hands-on conservation service to be leaders, stewards of the land, and engaged citizens who improve their communities."

== History ==
• The organization was modeled after Franklin Roosevelt's Civilian Conservation Corps of the 1930s and centered around small teams, diverse conservation projects and life changing experiences.

• MCC was established in 1991, by the Human Resource Development Councils in Billings, Bozeman and Kalispell. At that time, it was primarily a summer program serving disadvantaged youth.

• In 1993, the AmeriCorps National Service Program began funding the Montana Conservation Corps and enabled the progression to a year-round program. In 1995, the Montana Board of Crime Control granted the MCC funds to develop CorpsLINK, a program aimed at utilizing Corpsmembers to supervise youth performing community service and to mentor at-risk youth. These programs began utilizing Corpsmember's to perform service projects addressing community needs in addition to performing natural resource projects.

• A small staff in Bozeman manages the agency and a volunteer Board of Directors governs the organization. MCC crews do a variety of projects for natural resource agencies including: recreation area management, trail construction and repair, fence building, cave restoration, wildlife habitat improvement, stream rehabilitation, and playground construction. Community service projects performed by MCC crews include repairing senior citizen homes, distributing food to the needy, and building community gardens.

• Support for the MCC comes from many individuals and organizations that have a keen interest in the energy and enthusiasm of our young people. Over 200 public and private agencies sponsor MCC projects each year, with most of the financial support coming from City, County, State and Federal land management agencies. AmeriCorps funding through the Governor's Office of Community Service accounts for a little over half the budget with project sponsors providing the bulk of the remainder.

• MCC dispatched crews to hurricane relief in Florida in 2003 and 2004, Hurricane Katrina relief in 2005 and to Hurricane Sandy relief in 2012.
