= Maximum clade credibility tree =

A maximum clade credibility tree is a tree that summarises the results of a Bayesian phylogenetic inference. Whereas a majority-rule tree combines the most common clades, and usually yields a tree that wasn't sampled in the analysis, the maximum-credibility method evaluates each of the sampled posterior trees. Each clade within the tree is given a score based on the fraction of times that it appears in the set of sampled posterior trees, and the product of these scores are taken as the tree's score. The tree with the highest score is then the maximum clade credibility tree.
