= Cross-cockpit collimated display =

Display system for flight simulators

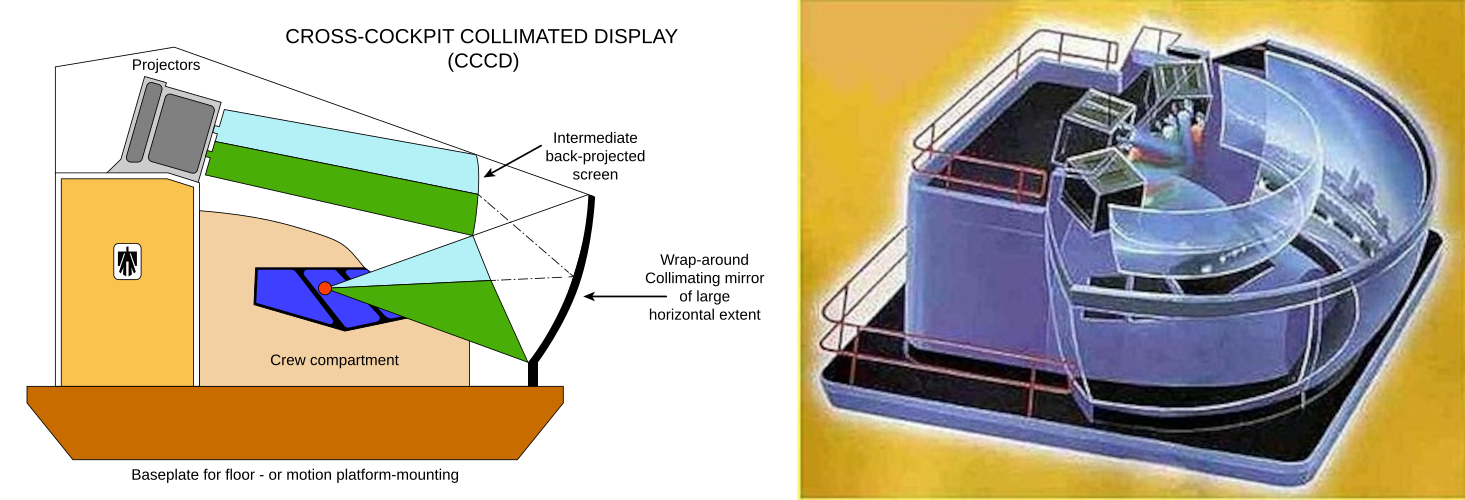
Diagram of a cross-cockpit collimated display and its fitment to a full flight simulator

A cross-cockpit collimated display (CCCD) is a display system used in full flight simulators (FFS) to provide the crew with a high-fidelity out-the-window view of the simulated environment around the aircraft. It is called cross-cockpit collimated because the light from a projected distant object is composed of rays that remain parallel or near-parallel across the cockpit (which typically sits two pilots side-by-side). Therefore, the projected object appears to both pilots to be realistically located in the distance, where the real object would be.

The technology was developed in the early 1980s by the British electronics company Rediffusion, and has since become the industry standard for FFS visual systems.

== Design ==
In the real world, the rays of light emitted by a distant source are virtually parallel to each other when they reach two observers standing side-by-side (Figure 1). This also means that the same observer moving around from one position to the other, or simply moving their head, will see the distant object as stationary within their field of view, with its light always coming from the same direction.

Early digital visual systems for flight simulators consisted in one or more translucent screens, directly illuminated by one or more projectors from the opposite side to the observer (Figure 2). From the observer's point of view, it is as if the source of light lay on the screen, much like what happens with a TV screen. Since the screen is only a few meters away from the observer, the light from the image of the distant object will appear to come from different directions as the observer moves around, giving the impression that the object is close by instead of far away.

Fig.1: real world optics

Fig. 2: direct projection system

Fig. 3: cross-cockpit collimated display

In a typical CCCD, instead, the screen is replaced by a curved mirror, which reflects the image from the translucent back-projection screen, now placed above the cockpit (Figure 3). Thank to the properties of parabolic mirrors, the rays of light from the screen are reflected by the mirror largely all in the same direction; that is they become collimated, and will give the observer the impression that the object represented is indeed distant.

== History ==
The cross-cockpit collimated display was first developed by British firm Rediffusion in Crawley, West Sussex, under the direction of development manager Stuart Anderson. Launched in 1981, the system was patented under the name WIDE – Wide-angle Infinity Display Equipment. After the patent expired, it was adopted by full flight simulator manufacturers worldwide, and remains to this day the standard for FFS visual systems.
