= Mortgage certificate (Switzerland) =

Swiss mortgage certification

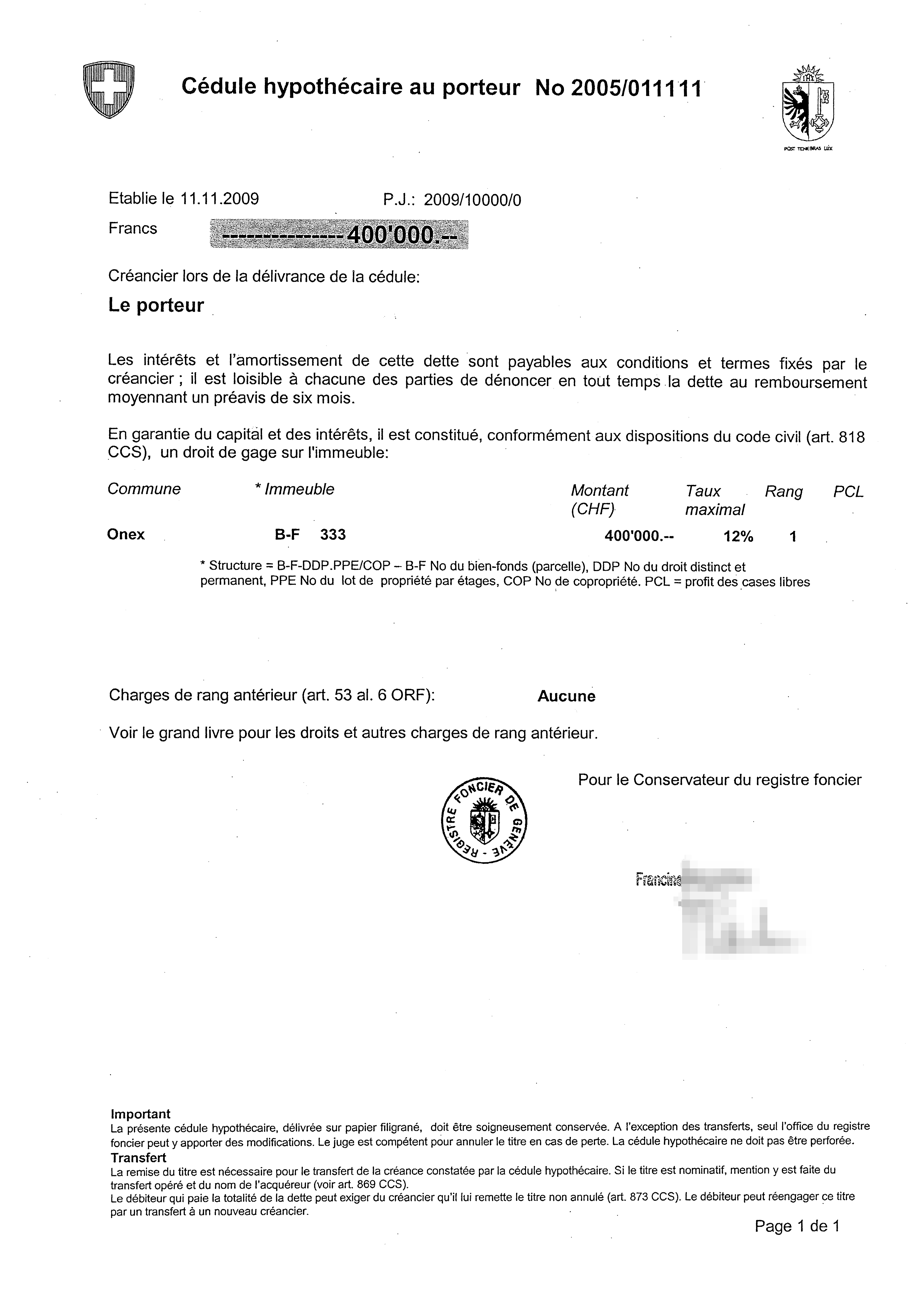
Example of a mortgage certificate issued by the land register of the Canton of Geneva. The original is printed on green paper.

Under Swiss law, a mortgage certificate is a right of pledge on real estate. It is a personal claim secured by an immovable asset.

== Description ==
A mortgage certificate can exist in two forms: a virtual form (known as a register certificate, which is in registered form only) or a paper form (bearer or registered).

In practice, a mortgage certificate is registered in the land register and is evidenced by a sheet of paper in the case of this type of note, or by a simple entry in the land register in the case of a register certificate, mentioning in particular the amount that the creditor (bearer of the security) may claim from the debtor, as well as the properties that are the subject of the security. Since it is a negotiable instrument, the certificate guarantees the registered nominal amount by means of a so-called cedular claim. If it is given as security for a debt (a claim arising from the basic relationship between the creditor and the debtor), the 2 claims coexist. It is therefore important to be careful when giving such a security to a bank, and to back it up with a trust agreement, guaranteeing that the creditor will not use the title to guarantee his own claim against another person.

The creditor (usually the bank) holds the security until the loan is repaid.

Once the loan is fully repaid, the title returns to the possession of the debtor. The latter can then use the same title to take out new loans up to the amount stated on the certificate.
