= Fragmentation (economics) =

In economics, fragmentation means organization of production into different stages, which are divided among different suppliers often are located in different countries. Products traded between firms in different countries are often components rather than final products. Final products may be sold to outside the region in which fragmentation happens: for example, East Asian countries often sell their final products to Europe and the USA. Producers in less developed countries operate in positions within a production chain which add less value to final product. Their challenge is to "climb upwards" on the transnational production chain. Production chains are often vertical hierarchies in which big multinational companies may be those who sell final products and set production standards for "lesser" producers. This kind of fragmentation is an important part of contemporary globalisation.

The United States Government Accountability Office defines fragmentation as "work [where] different parts of the same goal ... are broken out across different parts of the same agency.
