= Mortgage Credit Certificate =

Tax credit certificate

In the United States, a Mortgage Credit Certificate (more commonly referred to as MCC) is a certificate issued by certain state or local governments that allows a taxpayer to claim a tax credit for some portion of the mortgage interest paid during a given tax year.

== Uses ==
The MCC program is designed to help first-time homebuyers offset a portion of their mortgage interest on a new mortgage as a way to help homebuyers qualify for a loan. Because it is a tax credit and not a tax deduction, mortgage lenders will often use the estimated amount of the credit on a monthly basis as additional income to help the potential borrower qualify for the loan.

== Qualifications ==
Generally speaking, homebuyers who wish to obtain an MCC must meet certain minimum guidelines:

- Buyers must not have lived in a home that they owned in the previous three years.
- Buyers must meet income and purchase price restrictions.
- Buyers must intend to use the new home as a primary residence.

Some of these restrictions may be waived for certain circumstances. For example, following a natural disaster, state or local governments may raise or remove the income limits for affected municipalities temporarily to help spur redevelopment.

The MCC Credit can be used with Conventional/Conforming, FHA, USDA and VA home loans. These credits can help a homebuyer qualify for a little "bigger" (more expensive)home. While all homeowners can claim an itemized tax deduction for mortgage interest, you can go a step further with an MCC. An MCC reduces your tax liability, dollar-for-dollar, by a percentage of the mortgage interest you pay.

== Example ==
The amount of mortgage credit allowed varies depending on the state or local government that issues the certificates, but is capped at a maximum of $2000 per year if your State's rate is over 20%, by the IRS. As an example, if a homebuyer were to receive an MCC that offers a 30% credit on a $200,000 loan for 30 years with a rate of 6%, the allowable tax credit would be figured as follows (all numbers rounded):

- Mortgage Interest Paid (1st Year): $11,933
- x MCC Credit: 30%
- = Total Credit: $3579

Because the total credit in this example exceeds the IRS limit of $2000, the homebuyer would report a $2000 credit on their tax return. The buyer may continue to receive a tax credit for as long as they live in the home and retain the mortgage.
