= Multi-crew cooperation =

Multi-crew cooperation (MCC) is a training course that allows aircraft pilots to fly multi-crew aircraft. It is a requirement before a pilot may undertake a multi-crew aircraft type rating. It is also required for the issuance of an airline transport pilot license (ATPL) or a multi-crew pilot license (MPL).

In the European Union and the United Kingdom, MCC courses are regulated under Part-FCL 735. A longer course, the Airline Pilot Standards (APS MCC) course, is also available. This covers additional material including swept wing aircraft.
