= MCC (gene) =

Protein-coding gene in the species Homo sapiens

Identifiers
- Aliases: MCC, MCC1, mutated in colorectal cancers, WNT signaling pathway regulator, MCC regulator of WNT signaling pathway
- External IDs: OMIM: 159350; MGI: 96930; GeneCards: MCC

Gene location (Human)
Chr.	Chromosome 5 (human)
Band	5q22.2	Start	113,022,099 bp
Band	5q22.2	End	113,488,823 bp

Gene location (Mouse)
Chr.	Chromosome 18 (mouse)
Band	18 B3|18 23.74 cM	Start	44,558,127 bp
Band	18 B3|18 23.74 cM	End	44,945,249 bp
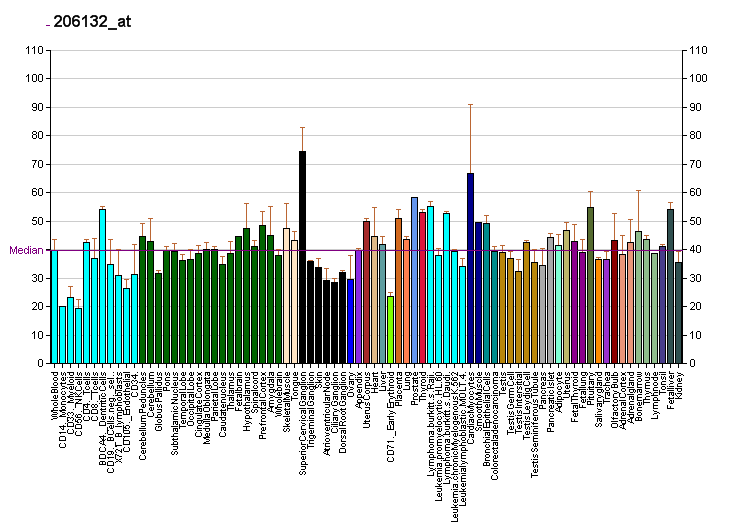
RNA expression pattern
Bgee	Human / Mouse (ortholog); Top expressed in: gingival epithelium; sural nerve; skin of hip; left ovary; germinal epithelium; skin of thigh; retinal pigment epithelium; endothelial cell; seminal vesicula; pars reticulata / Top expressed in: zygote; otolith organ; utricle; lobe of cerebellum; cerebellar vermis; secondary oocyte; gastrula; ventral tegmental area; iris; parotid gland; More reference expression data
BioGPS	More reference expression data
Gene ontology
Molecular function	protein binding; signaling receptor activity
Cellular component	cytoplasm; plasma membrane; cell projection; membrane; nucleus; lamellipodium; nucleoplasm; cytosol
Biological process	establishment of protein localization; negative regulation of epithelial cell proliferation; negative regulation of epithelial cell migration; Wnt signaling pathway; negative regulation of canonical Wnt signaling pathway; signal transduction
Sources:Amigo / QuickGO
Orthologs
Databases	NCBI: entry; OMA: entry
Species	Human	Mouse
Entrez	4163	328949
Ensembl	ENSG00000171444	ENSMUSG00000071856
UniProt	P23508	n/a
RefSeq (mRNA)	NM_001085377; NM_002387	NM_001033406; NM_001085373; NM_001085374
RefSeq (protein)	NP_001078846; NP_002378	n/a
Location (UCSC)	Chr 5: 113.02 – 113.49 Mb	Chr 18: 44.56 – 44.95 Mb
PubMed search
- Wikidata
View/Edit Human	View/Edit Mouse

Colorectal mutant cancer protein is a protein that in humans is encoded by the MCC gene.

This gene is a candidate colorectal tumor suppressor gene that is thought to negatively regulate cell cycle progression. The orthologous gene in the mouse expresses a phosphoprotein associated with the plasma membrane and membrane organelles, and overexpression of the mouse protein inhibits entry into S phase. Multiple transcript variants encoding different isoforms have been found for this gene.
