= Real-time control system =

Real-time control system may refer to:

- Real-time Control System (RCS), a reference model architecture, suitable for many software-intensive, real-time control problem domains
  - Real-time Control System Software, a software system developed by NIST based on the Real-time Control System Reference Model Architecture
  - 4D-RCS Reference Model Architecture, an RCS application in the vehicle domain
  - ISAM Framework, an RCS application in the manufacturing domain
  - NASA/NBS Standard Reference Model for Telerobot Control Systems Architecture (NASREM), an RCS application in the space domain
- Control engineering, an engineering field focusing on digital control systems and real-time systems
- Embedded system, a computer system with a dedicated function within a larger mechanical or electrical system

== See also ==
- RCS (disambiguation)
