= Control system (disambiguation) =

A control system is a device or set of devices to manage, command, invade, record, edit, hack, direct or regulate the behavior of other devices or systems. A control mechanism is a process used by a control system.

Control system may also refer to:

== General control systems ==
- Distributed control system, where control elements are not centralized
- Fuzzy control system, a control system that analyses and manipulates continuous variables (as opposed to discrete variables)
- Hierarchical control system
- Industrial control system
- Real-time control system (disambiguation), several meanings

== Specific control systems ==
- Kite control systems
- Lighting control system

=== Computer control systems ===
- Fire-control system, which assists a weapons system in firing speed and accuracy
- Networked control system, a hierarchical control system implemented by a computer network
- Revision Control System, which automates various processes to regulate and maintain data revisions
  - Source Code Control System

=== Vehicle control systems ===
- Aircraft flight control systems, which assists pilots in flying an aircraft
- Airborne early warning and control, Systems
- Cruise control, a system that maintains the speed of a vehicle
  - Autonomous cruise control system, a cruise control system that uses radar or laser input to detect its surroundings
- Environmental control system (aircraft), which controls environmental factors within an aircraft
- Reaction control system of a spacecraft, assisting in attitude control and steering
- Traction control system, which maintains the traction between a vehicle's wheels and the travelling surface

=== Biological control systems ===
- Cell nucleus, the central control system in every biological cell
  - Regulome, the entire set of control systems within a cell
- Homeostasis, the regulation and maintenance of the physical properties of an internal environment, particularly within an organism
- Endocrine system, the organ system most responsible for the control of biological processes
- Brain, the control system of the central nervous system and of all cognition
- Gene regulation, which controls what genes are and are not transcribed or expressed

== See also ==
- Control System, 2012 album by Ab-Soul
- Control theory
- Controller (control theory)
- Motion control
- Regulation (disambiguation)
- Systems control
