= Albus (surname) =

The surname Albus means white in Latin. Albus was a family name of ancient Rome, later lengthened to Albinus.

The surname may refer to:

- James S. Albus (1935–2011), a Senior National Institute of Standards and Technology Fellow and co-developer of the Marr-Albus theory
- Jim Albus (born 1940), an American golfer
- Lioba Albus (born 1958), German actor and cabaret actress

== See also ==
- Albuis (disambiguation)
