= Lioba =

Lioba may refer to:

- 974 Lioba, minor planet orbiting the Sun
- USS Lioba (AF-36), Adria-class stores ship acquired by the U.S. Navy for service in World War II
- Lioba (given name)
