= Robocrane =

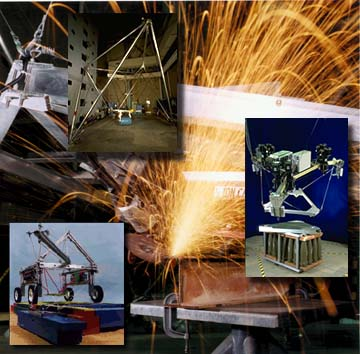
Robocrane Project.

The Robocrane is a kind of manipulator resembling a Stewart platform but using an octahedral assembly of cables instead of struts. Like the Stewart platform, the Robocrane has six degrees of freedom (x, y, z, pitch, roll, & yaw).

It was developed by Dr. James S. Albus of the US National Institute of Standards and Technology (NIST), using the Real-Time Control System which is a hierarchical control system. Given its unusual ability to "fly" tools around a work site, it has many possible applications, including stone carving, ship building, bridge construction, inspection, pipe or beam fitting and welding.

Albus invented and developed a new generation of robot cranes based on six cables and six winches configured as a Stewart platform. The NIST RoboCraneTM has the capacity to lift and precisely manipulate heavy loads over large volumes with fine control in all six degrees of freedom. Laboratory RoboCranes have demonstrated the ability to manipulate tools such as saws, grinders, and welding torches, and to lift and precisely position heavy objects such as steel beams and cast iron pipe. In 1992, the RoboCrane was selected by Construction Equipment magazine as one of the 100 most significant new products of the year for construction and related industries. It was also selected by Popular Science magazine for the "Best of What's New" award as one of the 100 top products, technologies, and scientific achievements of 1992.

A version of the RoboCrane has been commercially developed for the United States Air Force to enable rapid paint stripping, inspection, and repainting of very large military aircraft such as the C-5 Galaxy. RoboCrane is expected to save the United States Air Force $8 million annually at each of its maintenance facilities. This project was recognized in 2008 by a National Laboratories Award for technology transfer. Potential future applications of the RoboCrane include ship building, construction of high rise buildings, highways, bridges, tunnels, and port facilities; cargo handling, ship-to-ship cargo transfer on the high seas, radioactive and toxic waste clean-up; and underwater applications such as salvage, drilling, cable maintenance, and undersea waste site management.
