= Ampelmann system =

Offshore personnel transfer system

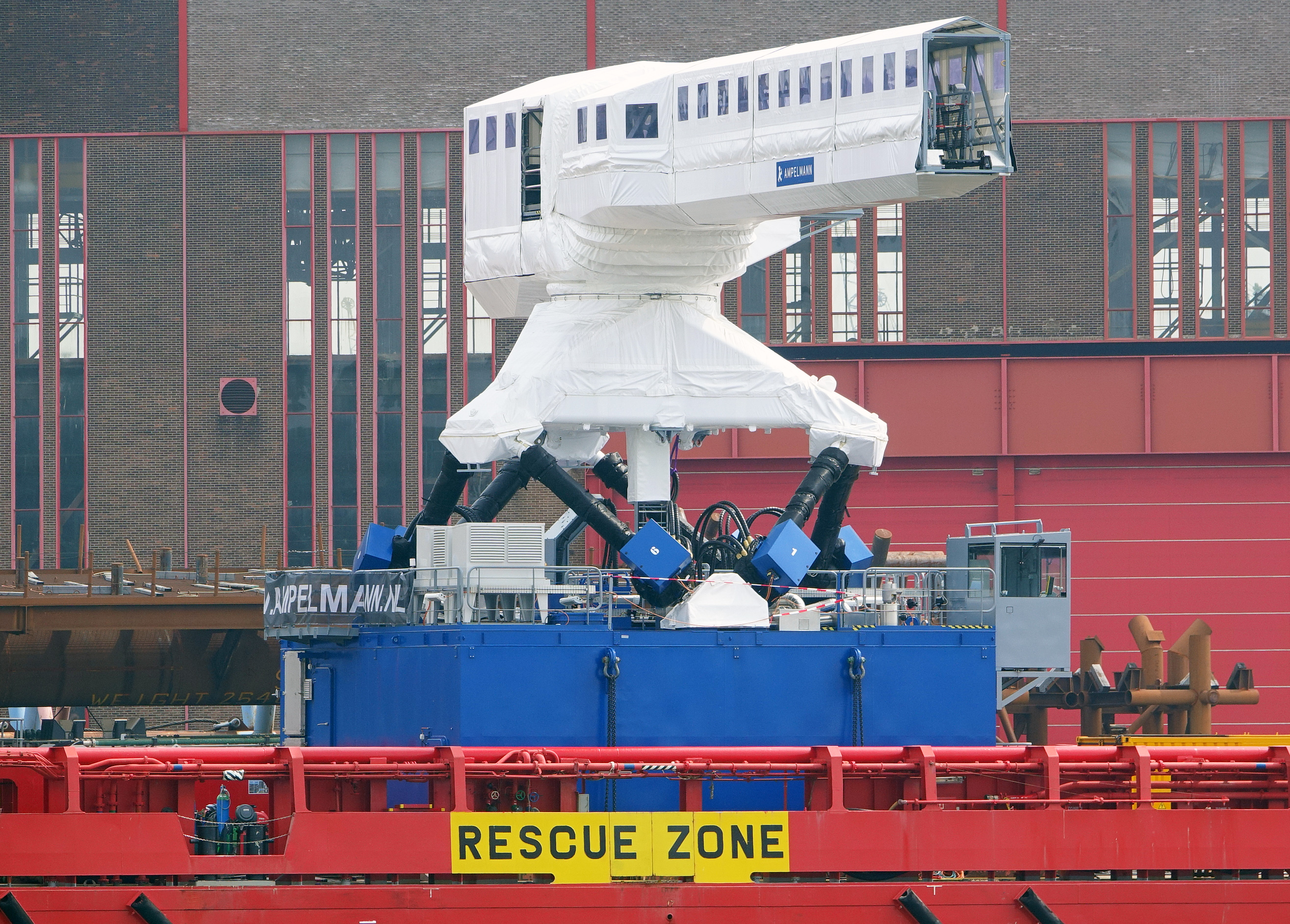
Ampelmann N-type

The Ampelmann system is an offshore personnel transfer system which was founded in 2008 as a spin-off of the Delft University of Technology. The motion compensation platform allows access from a moving vessel to offshore structures, even in high-wave conditions. transferring offshore crew from various types of vessels to offshore oil & gas platforms, offshore turbines and all other fixed and floating structures at sea.

== Ampelmann technology ==
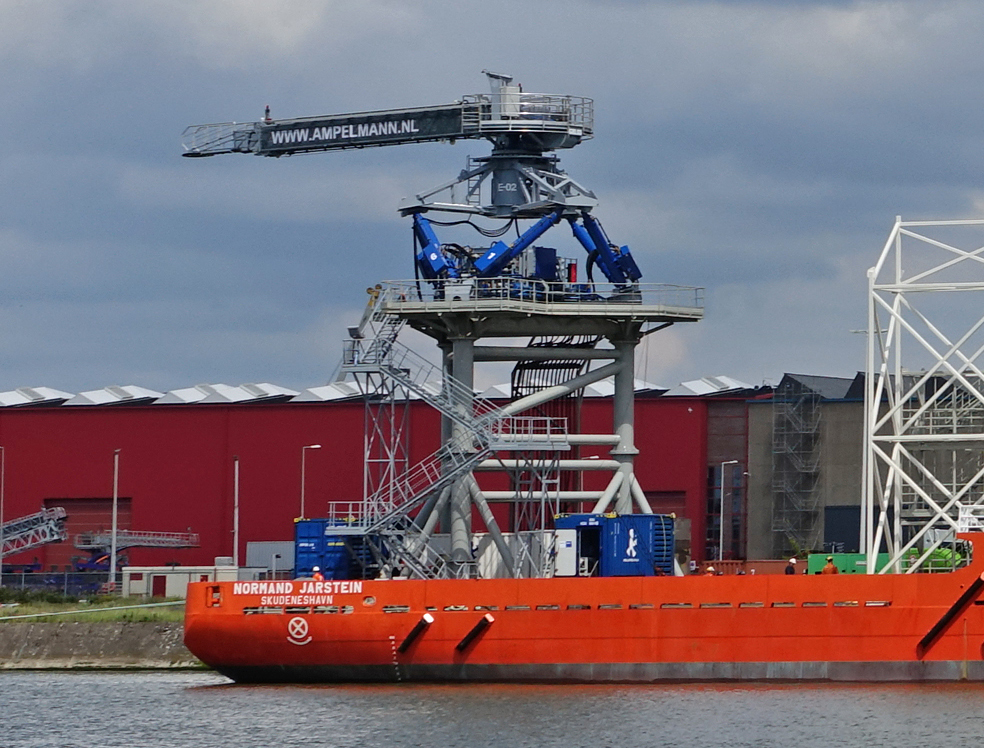
Ampelmann E-type on the platform supply vessel NORMAND JARSTEIN

Accessing any offshore structure can be problematic due to the movement of a vessel relative to the structure. The Ampelmann eliminates any relative motion by taking instant measurements of the ship's motions and then compensating movement using a Stewart platform. This means that the top of the Ampelmann remains completely stationary compared to the structure. The offshore gangway can then be extended towards the structure, so all personnel can walk to work offshore safely, even in high-wave conditions. The system operates at maximum windspeed of 20 m/s, or 38 knots.

Besides transferring people, the system can also be used for cargo transfer up to 1000 kg.

== Clients ==
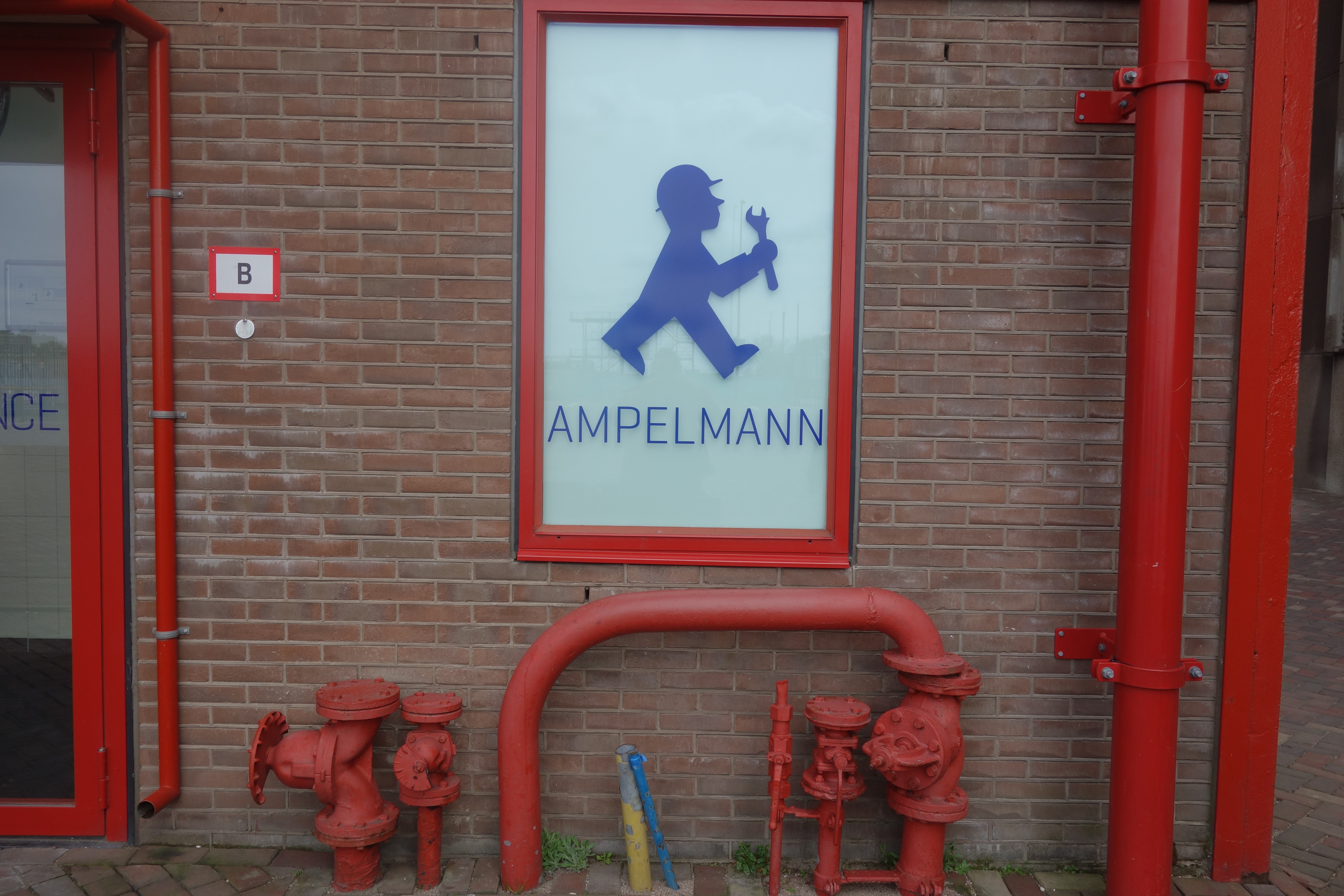
Ampelmann factory (Rotterdam)

The customers that use this system are mainly operating in the offshore oil & gas industry and the offshore wind industry. They use the system to enable their employees to perform maintenance on offshore wind turbines or to work on an offshore oil rig. Both market segments are growing in a rapid pace. The offshore wind sector, for example, has grown 54% in 2009. This growth has mainly been caused by the shift to more sustainable forms of energy generation by governments all over the world.

The customer relation of Ampelmann is only business-to-business (B2B). Platforms are usually owned by private companies, whereas wind parks are always run by private companies. There is no agent of independent status between Ampelmann and the user of the system.
