= Albuis =

Albius may refer to:

People of an Ancient Roman gens or cognomen

- Albia gens
- Juventinus Albius Ovidius
- Albius Tibullus

Surname

- Edmond Albius
