= Robotic paradigm =

Term in robotics

In robotics, a robotic paradigm is a mental model of how a robot operates. A robotic paradigm can be described by the relationship between the three basic elements of robotics: Sensing, Planning, and Acting. It can also be described by how sensory data is processed and distributed through the system, and where decisions are made.

== Hierarchical/deliberative paradigm ==
The hierarchical or deliberative paradigm describes a top-down control structure in which the robot's actions are driven by explicit planning. The robot follows a sense-plan-act sequence. At each step, it collects sensory information, updates an internal model of the world and determines the next action based on the model.

- The robot operates in a top-down fashion, heavy on planning.
- The robot senses the world, plans the next action, acts; at each step the robot explicitly plans the next move.
- All the sensing data tends to be gathered into one global world model.

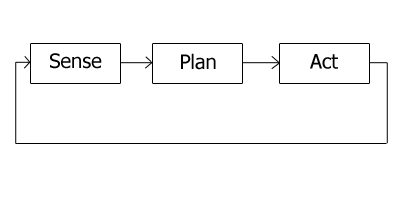
Hierarchical Paradigm schema

== The reactive paradigm ==
The reactive paradigm describes a bottom-up control structure in which the robot's actions emerge from direct interactions between the robots sensors and behaviours, without relying on a central plan or world model.

- Sense-act type of coupling.
- The robot can have multiple instances of Sense-Act couplings.
- These couplings are concurrent processes, called behaviours, which take the local sensing data and compute the best action to take independently of what the other processes are doing.
- The robot will do a combination of behaviours.

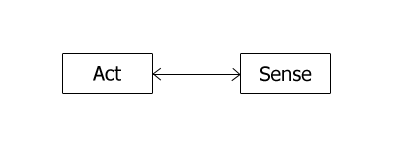
Reactive Paradigm schema

== Hybrid deliberate/reactive paradigm ==
The hybrid paradigm combines elements of both the behaviours and reactive approaches. The robot first plans (deliberates) how to decompose a task into smaller subtasks and selects suitable behaviours to accomplish each one. Once planning is complete, these behaviours execute concurrently following the reactive paradigm.

- The robot first plans (deliberates) how to best decompose a task into subtasks (also called “mission planning”) and then what are the suitable behaviours to accomplish each subtask.
- Then the behaviours starts executing as per the Reactive Paradigm.
- Sensing organization is also a mixture of Hierarchical and Reactive styles; sensor data gets routed to each behaviour that needs that sensor, but is also available to the planner for construction of a task-oriented global world model.

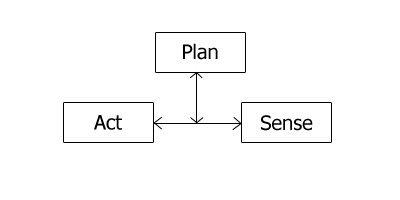
Hybrid Deliberate/Reactive Paradigm schema

== See also ==
- Behavior-based robotics
- Hierarchical control system
- Subsumption architecture
