= Lioba (given name) =

Lioba is a feminine given name of German origin; also a spelling variant of Anglo-Saxon "Leoba". Both originate from the word meaning "love". Notable people with the name include:

- Leoba (710–782), Anglo-Saxon missionary and saint
- Lioba Albus (born 1958), German actor and cabaret actress
- Lioba Betten (born 1948), German librarian, publisher and author
- Lioba Braun (born 1957), German opera singer and academic teacher
