= Stewart platform =

Type of parallel manipulator

An example of a Stewart platform

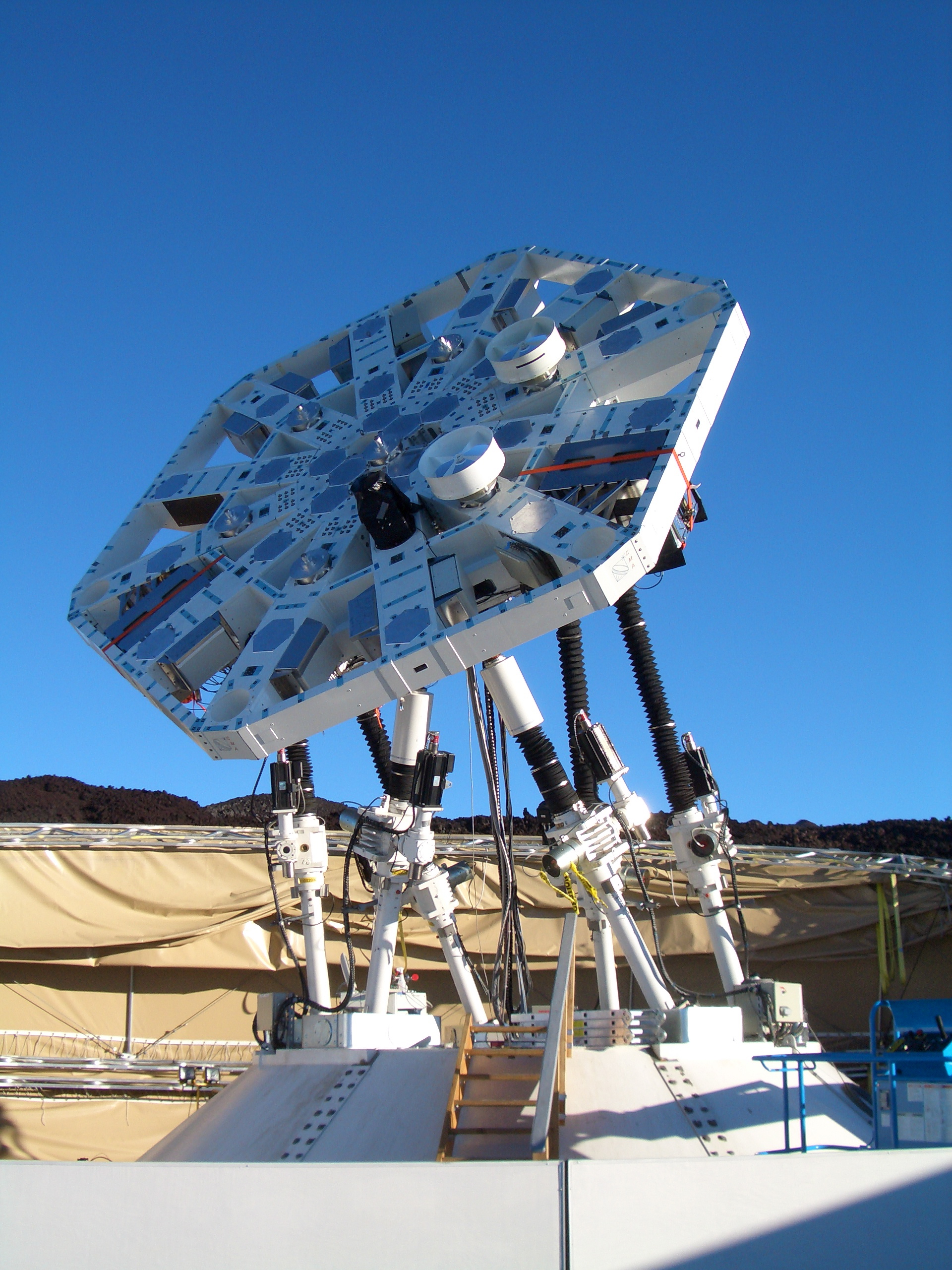
The AMiBA radio telescope, a cosmic microwave background experiment, is mounted on a 6 m (20 ft) carbon fibre hexapod.

Hexapod during the "Army-2021" exhibition

A Stewart platform is a type of parallel manipulator that has six prismatic actuators, commonly hydraulic jacks or electric linear actuators, attached in pairs to three positions on the platform's baseplate, crossing over to three mounting points on a top plate. All 12 connections are made via universal joints. Devices placed on the top plate can be moved in the six degrees of freedom in which it is possible for a freely-suspended body to move: three linear movements x, y, z (lateral, longitudinal, and vertical), and the three rotations (pitch, roll, and yaw).

The Stewart platform is known by various other names. In many applications, including in flight simulators, it is commonly referred to as a motion base. It is sometimes called a six-axis platform or 6-DoF platform because of its possible motions and, because the motions are produced by a combination of movements of multiple actuators, it may be referred to as a synergistic motion platform, due to the synergy (mutual interaction) between the way that the actuators are programmed. Because the device has six actuators, it is often called a hexapod (six legs) in common usage, a name which was originally trademarked by Geodetic Technology for Stewart platforms used in machine tools.

== History ==
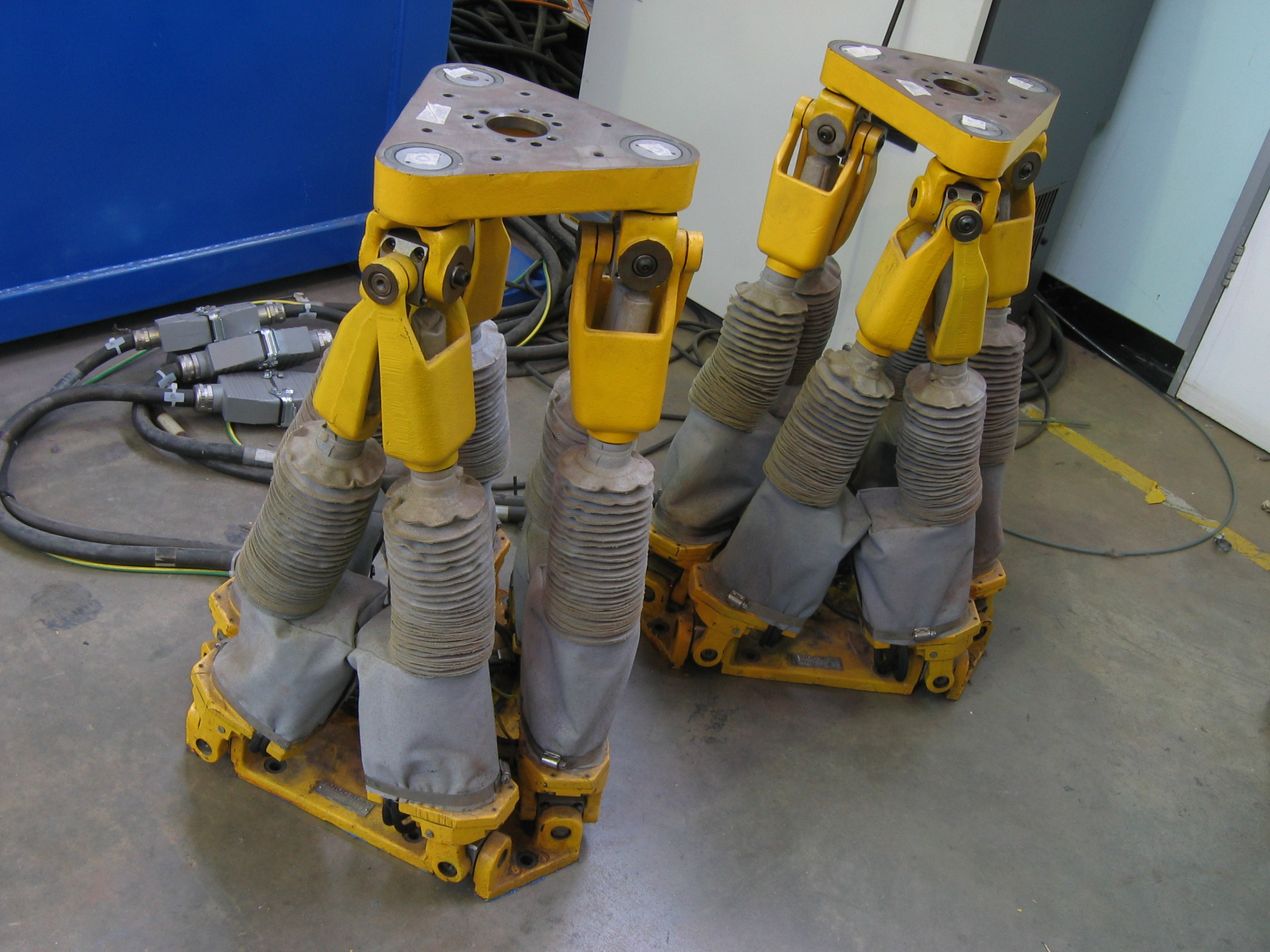
Two hexapod positioners

This specialised six-jack layout was first used by V E (Eric) Gough of the UK and was operational in 1954, the design later being publicised in a 1965 paper by D Stewart to the UK Institution of Mechanical Engineers. In 1962, prior to the publication of Stewart's paper, American engineer Klaus Cappel independently developed the same hexapod. Klaus patented his design and licensed it to the first flight simulator companies, and built the first commercial octahedral hexapod motion simulators.

Although the title Stewart platform is commonly used, some have posited that Gough–Stewart platform is a more appropriate name because the original Stewart platform had a slightly different design, while others argue that the contributions of all three engineers should be recognized.

== Actuation ==
=== Linear actuation ===
In industrial applications, linear actuators (hydraulic or electric) are typically used for their simple and unique inverse kinematics closed form solution and their good strength and acceleration.

=== Rotary actuation ===
For prototyping and low-budget applications, typically rotary servo motors are used. A unique closed-form solution for the inverse kinematics of rotary actuators also exists, as shown by Robert Eisele.

== Applications ==
Stewart platforms have applications in flight simulators, machine tool technology, animatronics, crane technology, underwater research, simulation of earthquakes, air-to-sea rescue, mechanical bulls, satellite dish positioning, the Hexapod-Telescope, robotics, and orthopedic surgery.

=== Flight simulation ===
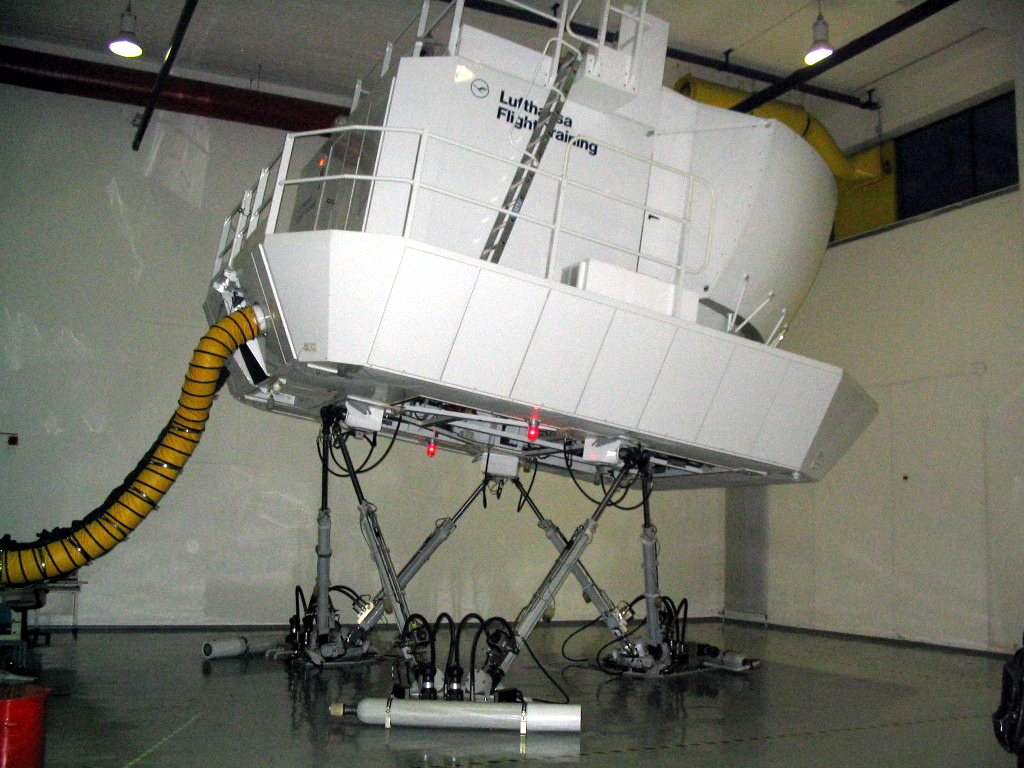
A Stewart platform in use by Lufthansa

The Stewart platform design is extensively used in flight simulators, particularly in the full flight simulator which requires all 6 degrees of freedom. This application was developed by Redifon, whose simulators featuring it became available for the Boeing 707, Douglas DC-8, Sud Aviation Caravelle, Canadair CL-44, Boeing 727, Comet, Vickers Viscount, Vickers Vanguard, Convair CV 990, Lockheed C-130 Hercules, Vickers VC10, and Fokker F-27 by 1962.

In this role, the payload is a replica cockpit and a visual display system, normally of several channels, for showing the outside-world visual scene to the aircraft crew that are being trained.

Similar platforms are used in driving simulators, typically mounted on large X-Y tables to simulate short term acceleration. Long term acceleration can be simulated by tilting the platform, and an active research area is how to mix the two.

=== Robocrane ===
James S. Albus of the National Institute of Standards and Technology (NIST) developed the Robocrane, where the platform hangs from six cables instead of being supported by six jacks.

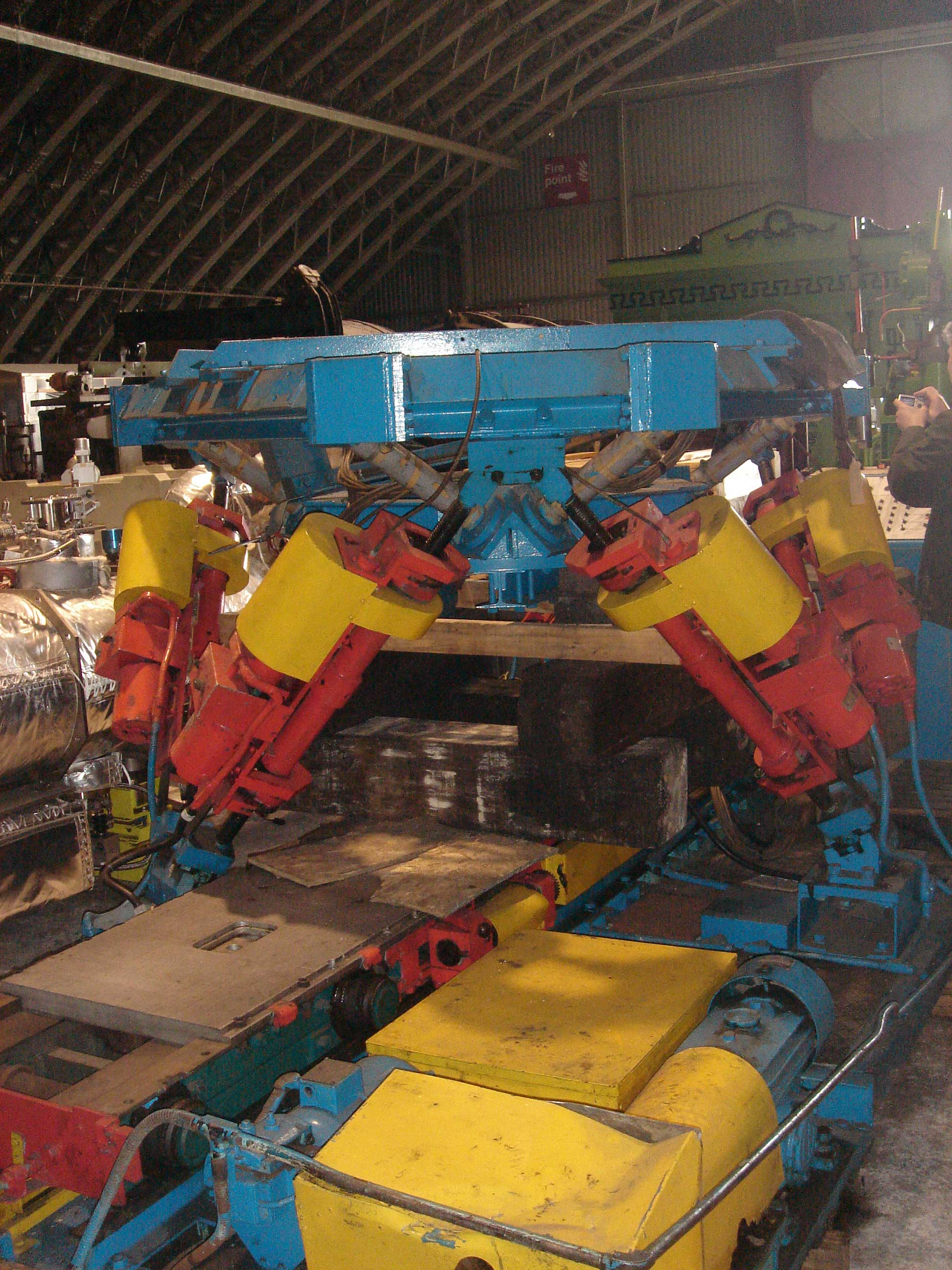
Eric Gough's Tire Testing Machine, which is a Stewart platform with large jacks

=== IDSS ===
International Docking System Standard docking ports (and predecessors like LIDS) use a Stewart platform to align space vehicles during the docking process.

=== CAREN ===
The Computer Assisted Rehabilitation Environment developed by Motek Medical uses a Stewart platform coupled with virtual reality to do advanced biomechanical and clinical research.

=== Taylor Spatial Frame ===
Dr. J. Charles Taylor used the Stewart platform to develop the Taylor Spatial Frame, an external fixator used in orthopedic surgery for the correction of bone deformities and treatment of complex fractures.

=== Mechanical testing ===
- First application: Eric Gough was an automotive engineer and worked at Fort Dunlop, the Dunlop Tyres factory in Birmingham, England. He developed his "Universal Tyre-Testing Machine" (also called the "Universal Rig") in the 1950s and his platform was operational by 1954. The rig was able to mechanically test tyres under combined loads. Dr. Gough died in 1972 but his testing rig continued to be used up until the late 1980s when the factory was closed down and then demolished. His rig was saved and transported to the Science Museum, London storage facility at Wroughton near Swindon.
- Recent applications: the rebirth of interest for a mechanical testing machine based on Gough-Stewart platform occurred in the mid 1990s. They are often biomedical applications (for example spinal study) because of the complexity and large amplitude of the motions needed to reproduce human or animal behaviour. Such requirements are also encountered in the civil engineering field for seism simulation. Controlled by a full-field kinematic measurement algorithm, such machines can also be used to study complex phenomena on stiff specimens (for example the curved propagation of a crack through a concrete block) that need high load capacities and displacement accuracy.

=== Motion compensation ===
Personnel transfer from an offshore construction via an Ampelmann system

The Ampelmann system is a motion-compensated gangway using a Stewart platform. This allows access from a moving platform supply vessel to offshore constructions even in high-wave conditions.

== See also ==
- Acceleration onset cueing
- Actuator
- Robot kinematics
