= RCS =

RCS may refer to:

== Organizations ==
=== Arts and entertainment ===
- Radio Corporation of Singapore
- Radcliffe Choral Society, a choral ensemble at Harvard University, US
- RCS MediaGroup (formerly Rizzoli-Corriere della Sera), an Italian publishing group
- Royal Conservatoire of Scotland
- Ryan Cayabyab Singers, a Philippine band

=== Education ===
- Rawmarsh Community School, South Yorkshire, England
- Richmond Christian School, British Columbia, Canada
- Rajshahi Collegiate School, Bangladesh
- Riverdale Country School, Bronx, New York, US
- Rogersville City Schools, a school district, Tennessee, US
- Rosehill Christian School, Texas, US
- Royal College of Science, a former higher education institution, London, England
- Royal College of Surgeons, an ancient college in England

=== Military ===
- Regional Command South (RC-S), part of NATO's Resolute Support Mission within Afghanistan
- Royal Corps of Signals, of the British Army

=== Sport ===
- RC Strasbourg Alsace, a French football club
- Representation of Czechs and Slovaks, a football team

=== Other organisations ===
- Rape Crisis Scotland
- Red Crescent Society
- Red Cross Society
- Romania Cable Systems
- RCS Motor Club, who maintain an antique fire engine for the Royal College of Science
- Radio Computing Services, an American software company

== Places ==
- First Czechoslovak Republic (RČS; Republic of Czechoslovakia), Czechoslovakia's official name between 1918 and 1920
- Rochester Airport (Kent) (IATA code:RCS), England
- Risalpur Cantonment railway station (station code:RCS), Pakistan

== Science and technology ==
- Radar cross-section, a measure of how detectable an object is by radar
- Reaction control system, a system of thrusters used to maneuver spacecraft
- Reentry control system, for planetary reentry
- Remote control system, an electronic device
- Rich Communication Services, a substitute for SMS used in mobile phone messaging

=== Computing ===
- Random circuit sampling, in quantum computing
- Real-time Control System, a reference model architecture
- Resource construction set, a GUI builder for GEM applications
- Revision Control System, an early implementation of a version control system

== Transportation ==
- Raleigh, Charlotte and Southern Railway (RC&S), a predecessor to Norfolk Southern Railway, US
- Regional Connectivity Scheme, for aviation in India, under UDAN
- Republic of China Ship (ship prefix: RCS, ROCS), for the Republic of China Navy

== Other uses ==
- Ryan Cochran-Siegle (born 1992), American World Cup alpine ski racer

== See also ==
- DVB-RCS, return channel via satellite
- RCS & RDS, Romanian telecom company
- RC (disambiguation)
