= James S. Albus =

American engineer (1935–2011)

James Sacra Albus
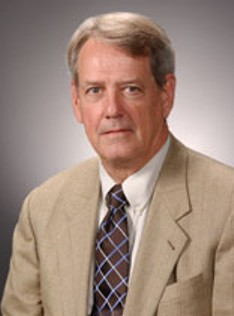
- James S. Albus, c. 2000
- Born: May 4, 1935; Louisville, Kentucky, U.S.
- Died: April 17, 2011 (aged 75)
- Education: Wheaton College (BS); Ohio State University (MS); University of Maryland, College Park (PhD)
- Occupation: Engineer
- Employer: National Institute of Standards and Technology

James Sacra Albus (May 4, 1935 – April 17, 2011) was an American engineer, Senior NIST Fellow and founder and former chief of the Intelligent Systems Division of the Manufacturing Engineering Laboratory at the National Institute of Standards and Technology (NIST).

== Biography ==
Born in Louisville, Kentucky, Albus received the B.S. degree in physics from Wheaton College, Illinois, in 1957 and the M.S. degree in electrical engineering from Ohio State University, Columbus, in 1958. In 1972 he received a Ph.D. in Electrical Engineering from the University of Maryland, College Park.

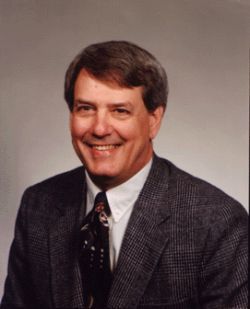
James S. Albus, 1970s

From 1957 to 1973 Albus worked at NASA starting in 1957 as Physicist-Engineer on Project Vanguard at the Naval Research Laboratory, Washington DC. From 1958 to 1969 he was Physicist-Engineer at the NASA Goddard Space Flight Center and from 1963 Acting Head of the Video Techniques Section. From 1969 to March 1973 he was head of the Cybernetics and Subsystems Development Section. In the 1960s he was associated with the early Vanguard satellite program and responsible for the optical aspect sensors on seven Goddard satellites, more than ten sounding rockets, and over 15 NASA spacecraft.

From 1973 to 2008 Albus worked at the National Bureau of Standards (NBS) which changed its name in 1988 to the National Institute of Standards and Technology (NIST). March 1973 to June 1980 he was Project Manager for Sensors and Computer Control Technology, NBS where he developed the Cerebellar Model Arithmetic Computer (CMAC) neural net model. From June 1980 to January 1981 he was leader of the Programmable Automation Group at the NBS and developed the RCS reference model architecture for the Automated Manufacturing Research Facility. From 1981 to 1996 he was chief of the Robot Systems Division at NIST. Here he founded the Robot Systems Division, developed the RoboCrane, and many applications of the RCS architecture for DARPA, NASA, ARL, U.S. Bureau of Mines, Ford, and General Motors. From 1995 to 1998 as Chief, Intelligent Systems Division, NIST he managed a Division of 35 professional scientists and engineers with an $8+ million per year budget. He developed the 4D/RCS architecture for the Army Research Lab (ARL) Demo III Experimental Unmanned Vehicle program. From 1998 to 2008 he was a Senior NIST Fellow, National Institute of Standards and Technology (NIST) Provided technical leadership to the Intelligent Systems Division and served as Principal Investigator for the implementation of intelligent ground vehicle projects funded by the Army and DARPA.

From June 2008 to 2009 he was a Senior Fellow of the Krasnow Institute for Advanced Studies at George Mason University, Fairfax, Virginia, where he worked toward advancing the understanding of the computational and representational mechanisms of the human brain. From 2008 to 2011 he worked part-time at Robotic Technology Incorporated (RTI) and Robotic Research, LLC.

He was a member of the editorial board of the Wiley Series on Intelligent Systems served on the editorial boards of six journals related to intelligent systems and robotics" Autonomous Robots, Robotics and Autonomous Systems, Journal of Robotic Systems, Intelligent Automation and Soft Computing.

In 1962 he received the highest NASA cash award granted to that time for the invention of the Digital Solar Aspect Sensor. In 1984 he was winner of the Joseph F. Engelberger Award for robotics technology. He also received several other awards for his work in control theory including the NIST Applied Research Award, the Department of Commerce Gold and Silver Medals, the Industrial Research IR-100 award, the Presidential Rank Meritorious Executive, the Jacob Rabinow Award, and the Japan Industrial Robot Association R&D Award.

== Work ==
Albus made contributions to cerebellar robotics, developed a two-handed manipulator system known as the Robocrane (a crane-like variation on the Stewart platform idea), and proposed an economic concept known as "Peoples' Capitalism". Peoples' Capitalism is similar to the ideas of Louis O. Kelso and discusses the question "how would we live without jobs?". Albus himself described the impact of his economic ideas as "slight".

Albus's vision concerns included the following: a world without poverty, a world of prosperity, a world of opportunity, a world without pollution, a world without war, and includes a detailed plan for achievement of these goals.

=== Brain theory ===
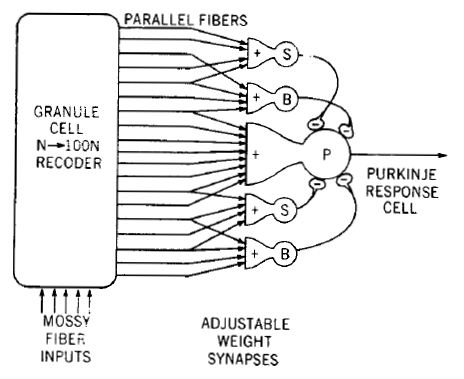
Model of Cerebellar Perceptron, 1971

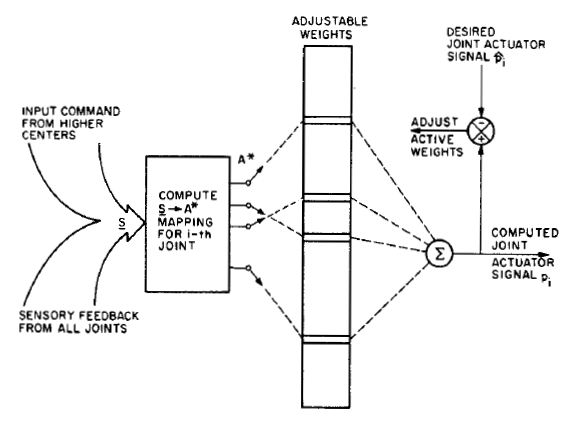
Diagram of the CMAC system, 1975

In 1971, he published a new theory of cerebellar function that modified and extended a previous theory published by David Marr in 1969.

=== Neural nets ===
Based on his cerebellar model, Albus invented a new type of neural net computer, the Cerebellar Model Articulation Controller (CMAC), for which he received the IR-100 award from Industrial Research Magazine as one of the 100 most important industrial innovations of the year 1976.

=== RoboCrane ===
Albus invented and developed a new generation of robot cranes based on six cables and six winches configured as a Stewart platform.

=== Real-time Control System ===
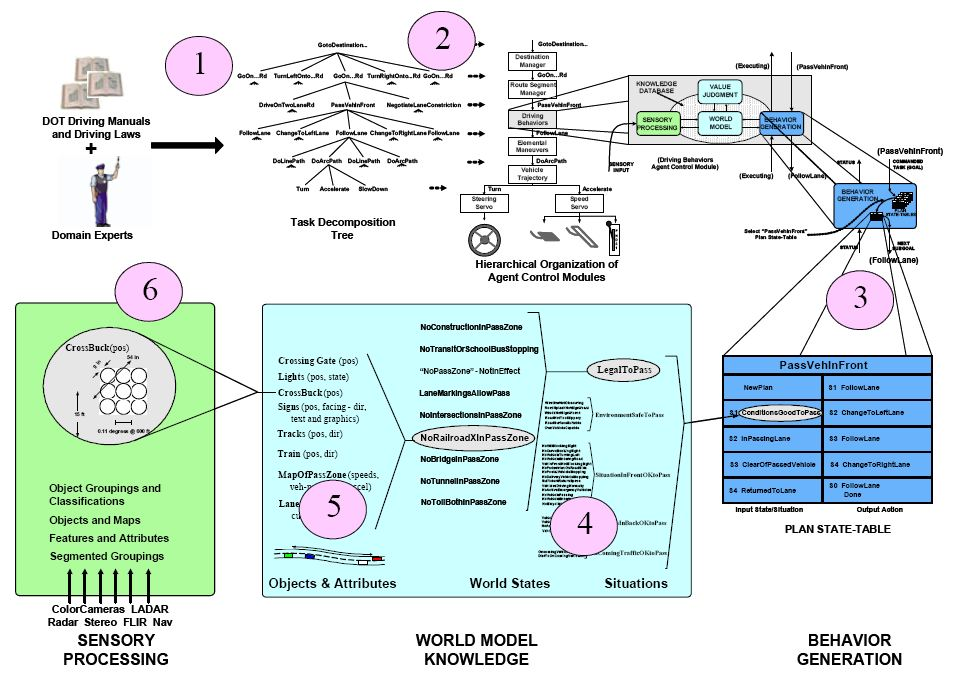
The six steps of the RCS methodology for knowledge acquisition and representation

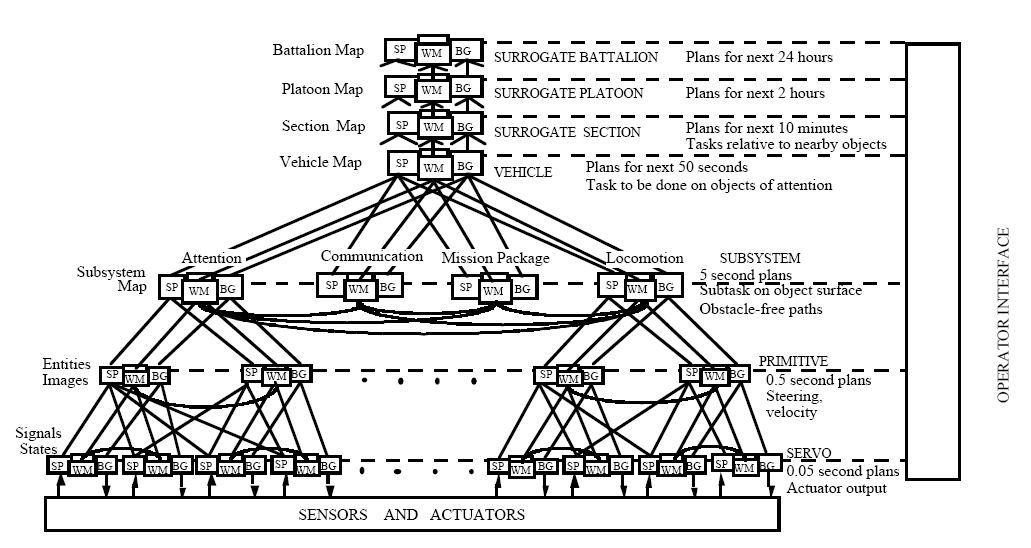
An RCS application: The 4D/RCS reference model architecture for an individual vehicle. Processing nodes are organized such that the BG modules form a command tree. Information in the KD is shared between WM modules in nodes above, below, and at the same level within the same subtree. KD modules are not shown in this figure.

Albus co-invented the Real-Time Control System (RCS), a reference model architecture that has been used over the past 25 years for a number of intelligent systems including the NBS Automated Manufacturing Research Facility (AMRF), the NASA telerobotic servicer, a DARPA Multiple Autonomous Undersea Vehicle project, a nuclear Submarine Operational Automation System, a Post Office General Mail facility, a Bureau of Mines automated mining system, a commercial open architecture machine tool controller, and numerous advanced robotic projects, including the Army Research Lab Demo III Experimental Unmanned Ground vehicle.

During the 1980s, the Albus-Barbera reference model architecture (a.k.a. RCS - for Real-time Control System) provided the fundamental integrating principle of the National Bureau of Standards (NBS) Automated Manufacturing Research Facility (AMRF.) This was an $80 million experimental automated factory-of-the-future. It was co-funded by the U.S. Navy Manufacturing Technology Program and the National Bureau of Standards (NBS). The success of the AMRF was largely responsible for the Congressional Legislation that transformed NBS into NIST.

=== Computational Theory of Mind ===
The 4D-RCS Reference Model Architecture is a reference model for military unmanned vehicles developed by the NIST, which describes how software components of military unmanned vehicles should be identified and organized. Albus has extended the reference model to a cognitive architecture for Intelligent Multi-Agent Systems. Albus (2009) described:

This extended architecture is designed to enable any level of intelligent behavior, up to and including human levels of performance in driving vehicles and coordinating tactical behaviors between autonomous air, ground, and amphibious vehicle systems. It addresses the fundamental theoretical questions regarding whether computational processes are capable of emulating the functional processes in the brain, and provides a theoretical basis for understanding how the machinery of the brain generates the processes of the mind. Albus' work has led to a biologically plausible model of representation and computation in the human cortex.

== Publications ==
Albus has published more than 150 scientific papers, journal articles, and government studies on intelligent systems and robotics, and authored or coauthored six books:

- 1976. Peoples' Capitalism: The Economics of the Robot Revolution. New World Books. ISBN 0-917480-01-5
- 1981. Brains, Behavior, and Robotics. Byte/McGraw-Hill. ISBN 0-07-000975-9
- 2001. Engineering of Mind: An Introduction to the Science of Intelligent Systems. Wiley. ISBN 0-471-43854-5
- 2001. The RCS Handbook: Tools for Real-Time Control Systems Software Development. Wiley. ISBN 0-471-43565-1
- 2002. Intelligent Systems: Architecture, Design, and Control. Wiley. ISBN 0-471-19374-7
- 2011. Path To A Better World: A Plan for Prosperity, Opportunity, and Economic Justice. iUniverse. ISBN 978-1462035328
