= 974 Lioba =

Main-belt asteroid

Discovery
- Discovered by: K. Reinmuth
- Discovery site: Heidelberg Obs.
- Discovery date: 18 March 1922

Designations
- Pronunciation: /liˈoʊbə/
- Named after: Saint Leoba (missionary to Germany)
- Alternative designations: A922 FC · 1930 DA_{1} A906 FG · A916 UO; 1922 LS · 1906 FG
- Minor planet category: main-belt · (middle) background

Orbital characteristics
- Epoch 31 May 2020 (JD 2459000.5)
- Uncertainty parameter 0
- Observation arc: 113.13 yr (41,319 d)
- Aphelion: 2.8155 AU
- Perihelion: 2.2536 AU
- Semi-major axis: 2.5346 AU
- Eccentricity: 0.1109
- Orbital period (sidereal): 4.04 yr (1,474 d)
- Mean anomaly: 248.30°
- Mean motion: 0° 14^{m} 39.48^{s} / day
- Inclination: 5.4563°
- Longitude of ascending node: 86.678°
- Argument of perihelion: 301.86°

Physical characteristics
- Mean diameter: 18.39±2.6 km; 25.001±0.481 km; 28.71±0.91 km
- Synodic rotation period: 38.7 h
- Geometric albedo: 0.163±0.011; 0.214±0.028; 0.3965±0.138
- Spectral type: Tholen = S; B–V = 0.912±0.021; U–B = 0.468±0.031
- Absolute magnitude (H): 10.4

974 Lioba (prov. designation: A922 FC or 1922 LS) is a stony background asteroid from the central regions of the asteroid belt, approximately 25 kilometers (16 miles) in diameter. It was discovered on 18 March 1922, by astronomer Karl Reinmuth at the Heidelberg-Königstuhl State Observatory in southern Germany. The S-type asteroid has a longer than average rotation period of 38.7 hours. It was named after missionary Saint Leoba (Lioba).

== Orbit and classification ==
Lioba is a non-family asteroid of the main belt's background population when applying the hierarchical clustering method to its proper orbital elements. It orbits the Sun in the central asteroid belt at a distance of 2.3–2.8 AU once every 4.04 years (1,474 days; semi-major axis of 2.53 AU). Its orbit has an eccentricity of 0.11 and an inclination of 5° with respect to the ecliptic. The asteroid was first observed as A906 FG (1906 FG) at the Heidelberg Observatory in March 1906, where the body's observation arc begins 16 years later, with its official discovery observation in March 1922.

== Naming ==
This minor planet was named after Saint Leoba (also Lioba) (c. 710–782), abbess in Tauberbischofsheim, Germany, who helped Saint Boniface spreading Christianity throughout Germany. In 782, she was buried near Bonifatius in Fulda, Germany. The author of the Dictionary of Minor Planet Names confirmed the naming from private communications with Dutch astronomer Ingrid van Houten-Groeneveld, who worked as a young astronomer at Heidelberg.

== Physical characteristics ==
In the Tholen classification, Lioba is a common stony S-type asteroid.

=== Rotation period ===
In May 1984, a rotational lightcurve of Lioba was obtained from photometric observations by American astronomer Richard Binzel during a survey of 130 asteroids at the University of Texas McDonald Observatory and Cerro Tololo Inter-American Observatory. Lightcurve analysis gave a well-defined, longer-than average rotation period of 38.7 hours with a brightness amplitude of 0.37 magnitude (U=3). In April 2007, a poorly rated period determination by French amateur astronomer René Roy gave 15.6 hours (0.65000 days) or more (U=1).

=== Diameter and albedo ===
According to the surveys carried out by the Infrared Astronomical Satellite IRAS, the Japanese Akari satellite and the NEOWISE mission of NASA's WISE telescope, Lioba measures between 18.39±2.6 and 28.71±0.91 kilometers in diameter and its surface has a high albedo between 0.16 and 0.40. The Collaborative Asteroid Lightcurve Link derives an albedo of 0.3609 from the IRAS results, and calculates a diameter of 18.23 kilometers based on an absolute magnitude of 11.8.
