= Juventinus Albius Ovidius =

Juventinus Albius Ovidius was the name of the author of thirty-five distichs titled Elegia de Philomela, containing a collection of those words which are supposed to express appropriately the sounds uttered by birds, quadrupeds, and other animals. For example:

Mus avidus mintrit, velox mustecula drindit, Et grillus grillat, desticat inde sorex.

The age in which the author lived is quite unknown, but from the last couplet in the piece it would appear that he was a Christian. German philologist Gottfried Bernhardy attempted to prove from Spartianus that this and other trifles of a similar description were composed by the contemporaries of the emperor Geta, the son of Septimius Severus and the brother of Caracalla.
