= Lioba Albus =

German actress (born 1958)

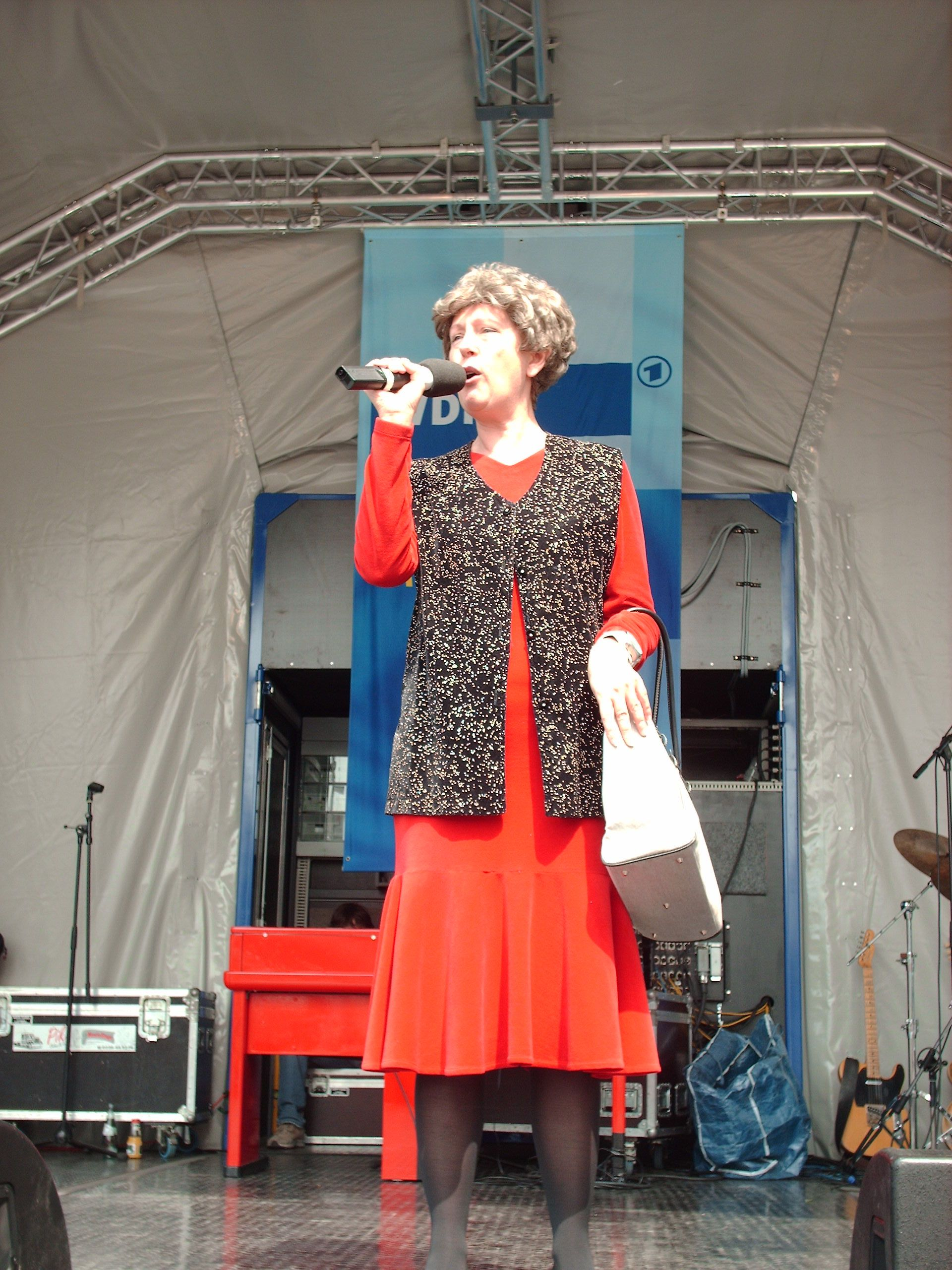
Lioba Albus as Mia Mittelkötter, Siegen, Germany

Lioba Albus (born September 27, 1958) is a German actor and cabaret actress.

== Career ==
Lioba Albus was born and grew up in Attendorn, Sauerland as the seventh child of her parents Heinrich and Hedwig Albus. After her Abitur at St.-Ursula-Gymnasium in 1977, she studied theater studies in Munich and attended the private acting school Zinner. During her training, she first appeared in touring theaters for children, and from 1983 she was a member of the permanent ensemble of the Dortmunder Kinder- und Jugendtheater. Before moving to Dortmund, she worked as an announcer for Bayerischer Rundfunk.

Since 1991, Lioba Albus has performed as a cabaret artist on stage, radio and television. Her main broadcaster is WDR. She has appeared in the programs Mitternachtsspitzen, Ladies Night, Blond am Freitag and 7 Tage, 7 Köpfe, among others. From 1995 to 2001, she hosted the WDR radio program Unterhaltung am Wochenende. In her home town of Attendorn, she hosts the annual Gauklerfest.

Lioba Albus has three children and lives in Dortmund. A cousin is the actor and dubbing artist Thomas Albus.

== Program ==
The cabaret artist takes up everyday situations in a satirical way and exaggerates typical social behaviour. Her most popular topic is the relationship between men and women. She often slips into the role of the fictitious Sauerland housewife "Mia Mittelkötter", who reveals her (sometimes only superficially) simple wisdom. Some press reviews have called Lioba Albus a "volcano of words".

Solo programs:

- Mit heißem Herzen
- Wenn Männer zuviel liegen
- Gewählte Höhepunkte – Kabarett à la carte
- Owie lacht
- Von der Göttin zur Gattin
- Single Bells (Weihnachts-program)
- Königin von Egoland
- Hitzewallungen (summer program)
- Das Weg ist mein Ziel
- Mia – eine Weltmacht mit 3 Buchstaben

Lioba Albus also performed with the cabaret artist Martin Herrmann (alias "Der Frauenflüsterer"), with the program Pottsau trifft Frauenflüsterer, with Norbert Alich in the program Was Gott getrennt.... She also appears repeatedly with Bruno Knust and the program Günna trifft Mia unter anderem at Theater Olpketal and at RuhrHOCHdeutsch.

== Books ==
- Betreutes Flirten für Spätberufene. Lübbe, Cologne 2023, ISBN 978-3-7517-4805-6
- Zusammen ist man weniger gemein. Lübbe, Cologne, 2022, ISBN 978-3-7857-2814-7
- Älter werde ich später. Lübbe, Cologne, 2021, ISBN 978-3-7857-2758-4
- Contribution in: Marianne Rogler (ed.): Frontfrauen. 28 female cabaret artists get going. Kiepenheuer & Witsch, Cologne 1995, ISBN 3-462-02474-4 (KiWi 393)
- Frau Mittelkötter knows her stuff. What men mean when they say something. Herder Verlag, Freiburg im Breisgau et al. 1996, ISBN 3-451-04474-9 (Herder-Spektrum 4474)
- With Lutz Debus: In der Ruhr liegt die Kraft. FönNixe, Dortmund 2012, ISBN 978-3-9815484-0-2

== Awards ==
- 1995 – Neustädter Kabaretttage: 1. Prize
- 1998 – Mindener Stichling – Solo Prize
- 2003 – Appointment as honorary senator of the Olpe carnival society
- 2011 - Award of the "Itter-Litter" of the KG Musketiere (carnival club from Hilden)
