= Automated mining =

Removal of human labor from the mining industry

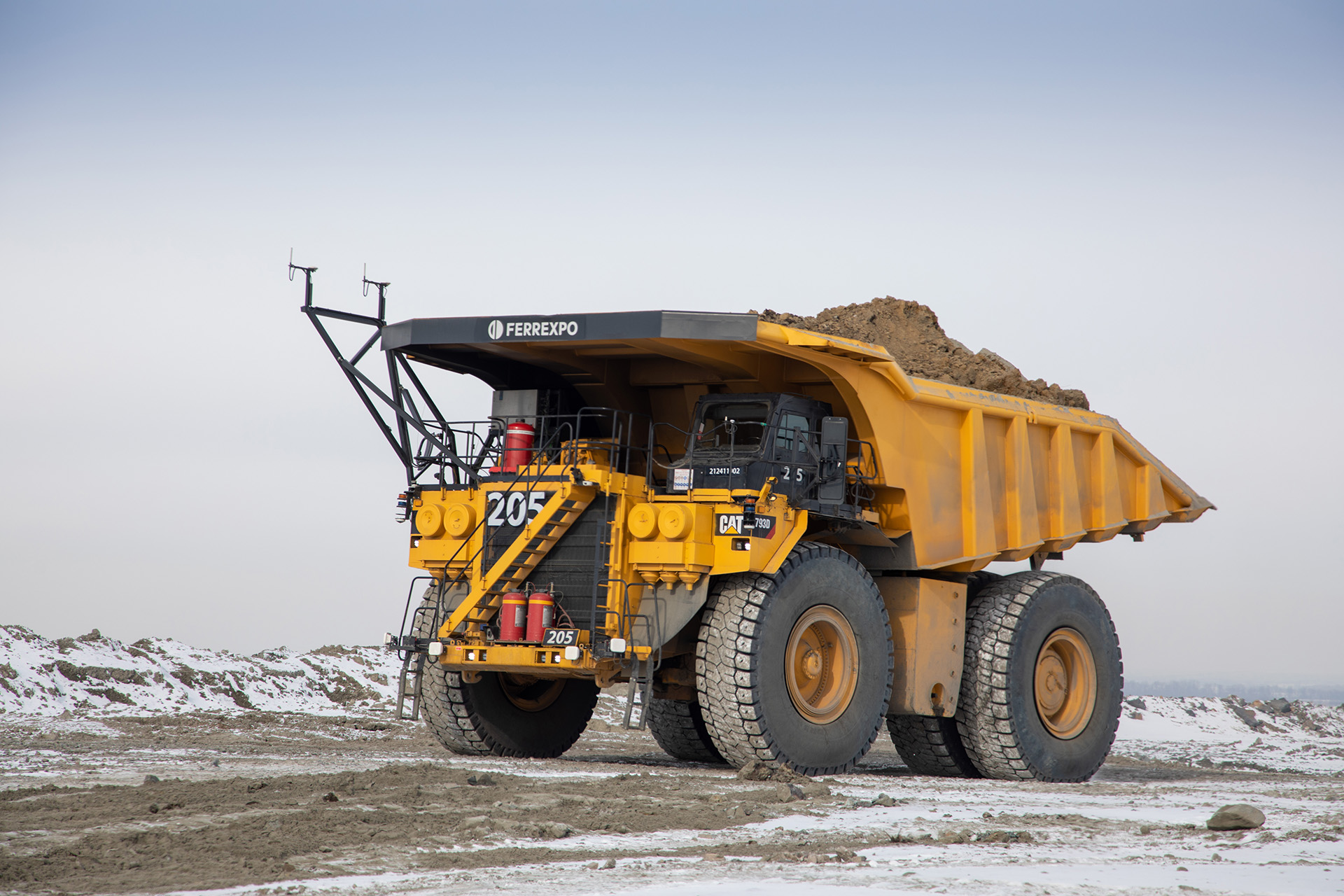
Autonomous mining truck

Automated mining involves the removal of human labor from the mining process. The mining industry is in the transition towards automation. It can still require a large amount of human capital, particularly in the developing world where labor costs are low so there is less incentive to increase efficiency. There are two types of automated mining: process and software automation, and the application of robotic technology to mining vehicles and equipment.

== Mine automation software ==
In order to gain more control over their operations, mining companies may implement mining automation software or processes. Reports generated by mine automation software allow administrators to identify productivity bottlenecks, increase accountability, and better understand return on investment.

== Mining equipment automation ==
Addressing concerns about how to improve productivity and safety in the mine site, some mine companies are turning to equipment automation consisting of robotic hardware and software technologies that convert vehicles or equipment into autonomous mining units.

Mine equipment automation comes in four different forms: remote control, teleoperation, driver assist, and full automation.

=== Remote control ===
Remote control mining equipment usually refers to mining vehicles such as excavators or bulldozers that are controlled with a handheld remote control. An operator stands in line-of-sight and uses the remote control to perform the normal vehicle functions. Because visibility and feel of the machine are heavily reduced, vehicle productivity is generally reduced as well using remote control. Remote control technology is generally used to enable mining equipment to operate in dangerous conditions such as unstable terrain, blast areas or in high risk areas of falling debris, or underground mining. Remote control technology is generally the least expensive way to automate mining equipment making it an ideal entry point for companies looking to test the viability of robotic technology in their mine.

=== Teleoperated mining equipment ===
Teleoperated mining equipment refers to mining vehicles that are controlled by an operator at a remote location with the use of cameras, sensors, and possibly additional positioning software. Teleoperation allows an operator to further remove themselves from the mining location and control a vehicle from a more protected environment. Joysticks or other handheld controls are still used to control the vehicle's functions, and operators have greater access to vehicle telemetry and positioning data through the teleoperation software. With the operator removed from the cab, teleoperated mining vehicles may also experience reduced productivity; however, the operator has a better vantage point than remote control from on-vehicle cameras and sensors and is further removed from potentially dangerous conditions.

=== Driver assist ===
"Driver assist" refers to partly automated control of mining machines. Only some of the functions are automated and operator intervention is needed. Common functions include both spotting assist and collision avoidance systems.

=== Full automation ===
"Full automation" can refer to the autonomous control of one or more mining vehicles. Robotic components manage all critical vehicle functions including ignition, steering, transmission, acceleration, braking, and implement control (i.e. blade control, dump bed control, excavator bucket and boom, etc.) without the need for operator intervention. Fully autonomous mining systems experience the most productivity gains as software controls one or more mining vehicles allowing operators to take on the role of mining facilitators, troubleshooting errors and monitoring efficiency.

== Benefits ==
The benefits of mining equipment automation technologies are varied but may include: improved safety, better fuel efficiency, increased productivity, reduced unscheduled maintenance, improved working conditions, better vehicle utilization, and reduced driver fatigue and attrition. Automation technologies are an efficient way to mitigate the effects of widespread labor shortages for positions such as haul truck driver. In the face of falling commodity prices, many mining companies are looking for ways to dramatically reduce overhead costs while still maintaining site safety and integrity; automation may be the answer.

== Drawbacks ==
Critics of vehicle automation often focus on the potential for robotic technology to eliminate jobs while proponents counter that while some jobs will become obsolete (normally the dirty, dangerous, or monotonous jobs), others will be created. Communities supporting underprivileged workers that rely on entry level mining positions are worried about and are calling for social responsibility as mining companies transition to automation technologies that promise to increase productivity in the face of falling commodity prices. Risk averse mining companies mining companies are also reluctant to commit large amounts of capital to an unproven technology, preferring more often to enter the automation scene at lower, more inexpensive levels such as remote control. There also are risks of sensor failure, software errors, and calibration errors for automatic mining equipment.

== Examples of autonomous mining equipment ==
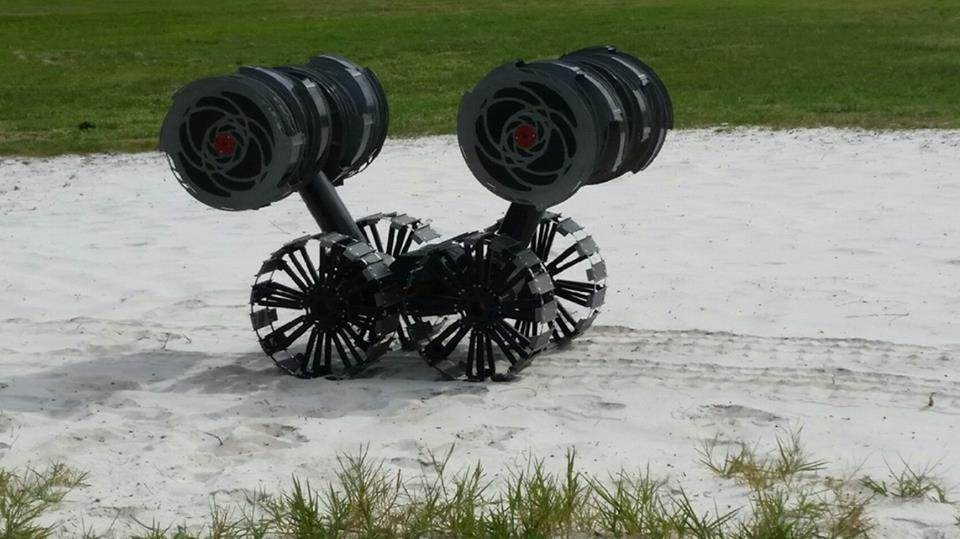
NASA's autonomous mining robot RASSOR

=== Mine of the future ===
Rio Tinto Group embarked on their Mine of the Future initiative in 2008. From a control center in Perth, Rio Tinto employees operate autonomous mining equipment in Australia's remote but mineral rich Pilbara region. The autonomous mining vehicles reduce the footprint of the mining giant while improving productivity and vehicle utilization. As of June 2014, Rio Tinto's autonomous mining fleet reached the milestone of 200 million tonnes hauled. Rio Tinto also operate a number of autonomous blast hole drill rigs.

=== Bingham Canyon Mine ===
Located near Salt Lake City, Utah, the Bingham Canyon Mine (Kennecott Utah Copper/Rio Tinto) is one of the largest open pit mines in the world and one of the world's largest copper producers. In April 2013, the mine experienced a catastrophic landslide that halted much of the mine's operations. As part of the cleanup efforts and to improve safety, mine administrators turned to remote control excavator, dozers and teleremote blast hole drills to perform work on the highly unstable terrain areas. Robotic technology helped Kennecott to reduce the steeper, more dangerous areas of the slide to allow manned vehicles access for cleanup efforts.

=== Automation of underground works in China ===
German company EEP Elektro-Elektronik Pranjic delivered and put into operation more than 60 sets of advanced automatic control for underground coal mining for the period ~ 2006–2016. For the first time completely deserted coal mining technology has been used by the Chinese concern «China National Coal Group Corp. (CME)» at the mine «Tang Shan Gou» (longwall mining, shearers, three lava, depth 200 m), and at the mine «Nan Liang» (one plow, depth 100 m). Both coal mines have coal layer thickness 1–1.7 m. Monitoring the harvesting is carried out by means of video cameras (in real time with signal transmission over optical fiber). Typically, an underground staff is required to monitor the production process and for carrying out repairs. Automation has improved the safety and economic performance.

=== Next Generation Mining ===
BHP have deployed a number of autonomous mining components as part of their Next Generation Mining program. This includes autonomous drills and autonomous trucks in the Pilbara region.

=== Autonomy in Europe ===
In March 2021, Ferrexpo plc announced that it had successfully deployed the first large scale autonomous mining trucks in Europe with the conversion of its CAT 793D haul trucks. The company has used semi-autonomous drill rigs at its operations since 2017.

== See also ==
- Robotics
- Mechanization
- Environmental impact of mining
- Natural resource
