= Mason's gain formula =

Method in electronic engineering

Mason's gain formula (MGF) is a method for finding the transfer function of a linear signal-flow graph (SFG). The formula was derived by Samuel J. Mason, for whom it is named. MGF is an alternate method to finding the transfer function algebraically by labeling each signal, writing down the equation for how that signal depends on other signals, and then solving the multiple equations for the output signal in terms of the input signal. MGF provides a step by step method to obtain the transfer function from a SFG. Often, MGF can be determined by inspection of the SFG. The method can easily handle SFGs with many variables and loops including loops with inner loops. MGF comes up often in the context of control systems, microwave circuits and digital filters because these are often represented by SFGs.

== Formula ==
The gain formula is as follows:

$$G = \frac{y_\text{out}}{y_\text{in}} = \frac{ \sum_{k=1}^N  {G_k \Delta _k} }{ \Delta\ }$$

$$\Delta = 1 - \sum L_i + \sum L_iL_j- \sum L_iL_jL_k + \cdots + (-1)^m \sum \cdots +\cdots$$

where:

- Δ = the determinant of the graph.
- y_{in} = input-node variable
- y_{out} = output-node variable
- G = complete gain between y_{in} and y_{out}
- N = total number of forward paths between y_{in} and y_{out}
- G_{k} = path gain of the kth forward path between y_{in} and y_{out}
- L_{i} = loop gain of each closed loop in the system
- L_{i}L_{j} = product of the loop gains of any two non-touching loops (no common nodes)
- L_{i}L_{j}L_{k} = product of the loop gains of any three pairwise nontouching loops
- Δ_{k} = the cofactor value of Δ for the k^{th} forward path, with the loops touching the k^{th} forward path removed.

=== Definitions ===
- Path: a continuous set of branches traversed in the direction that they indicate.
- Forward path: A path from an input node to an output node in which no node is touched more than once.
- Loop: A path that originates and ends on the same node in which no node is touched more than once.
- Path gain: the product of the gains of all the branches in the path.
- Loop gain: the product of the gains of all the branches in the loop.

=== Procedure to find the solution ===
1. Make a list of all forward paths, and their gains, and label these G_{k}.
2. Make a list of all the loops and their gains, and label these L_{i} (for i loops). Make a list of all pairs of non-touching loops, and the products of their gains (L_{i}L_{j}). Make a list of all pairwise non-touching loops taken three at a time (L_{i}L_{j}L_{k}), then four at a time, and so forth, until there are no more.
3. Compute the determinant Δ and cofactors Δ_{k}.
4. Apply the formula.

== Examples ==
=== Circuit containing two-port ===
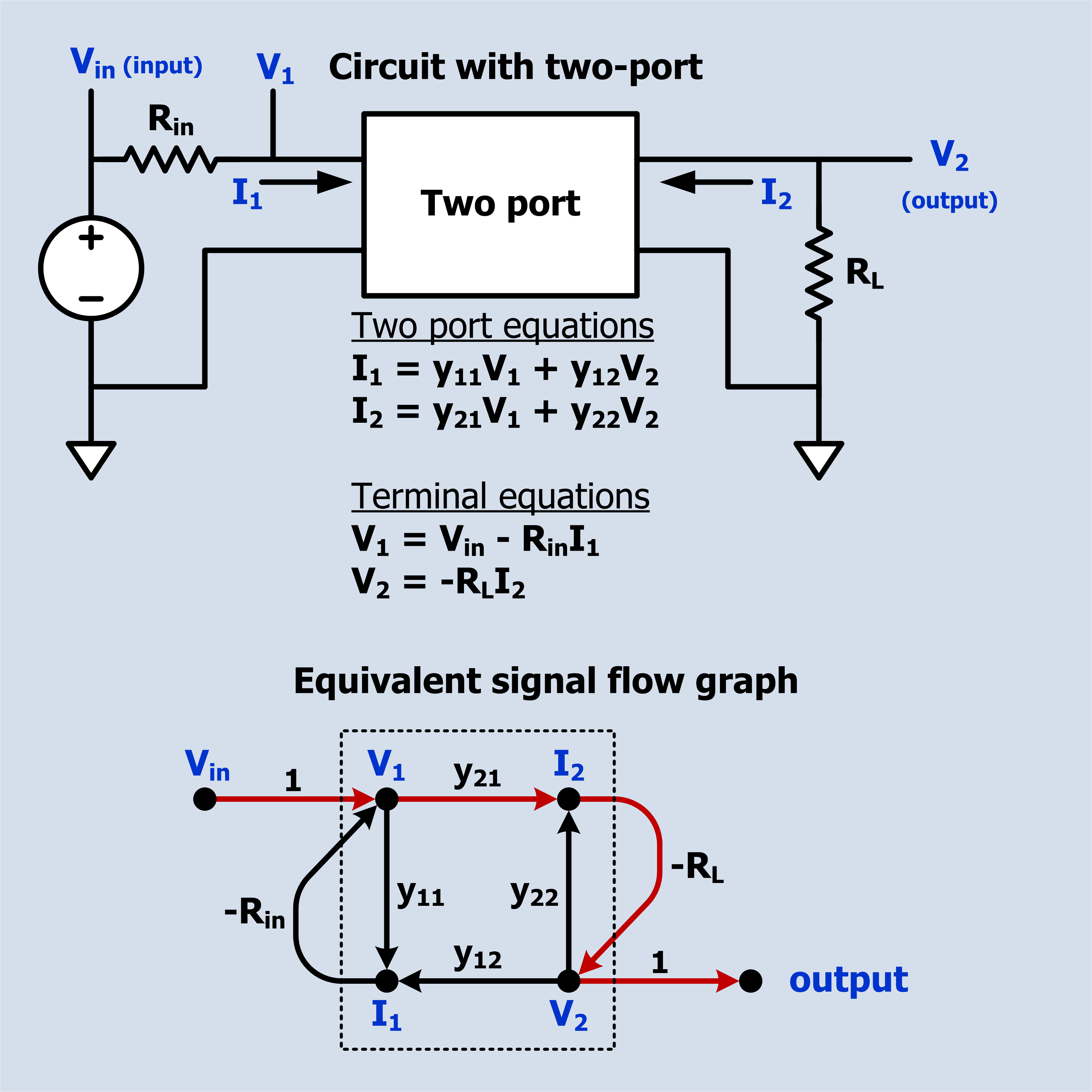
Signal flow graph of a circuit containing a two port. The forward path from input to output is shown in a different color.

The transfer function from V_{in} to V_{2} is desired.

There is only one forward path:

- V_{in} to V_{1} to I_{2} to V_{2} with gain $G_1 = -y_{21} R_L \,$

There are three loops:

- V_{1} to I_{1} to V_{1} with gain $L_1 = -R_\text{in} y_{11} \,$
- V_{2} to I_{2} to V_{2} with gain $L_2 = -R_L y_{22} \,$
- V_{1} to I_{2} to V_{2} to I_{1} to V_{1} with gain $L_3 = y_{21} R_L y_{12} R_\text{in} \,$

$\Delta = 1 - ( L_1 + L_2 + L_3 ) + ( L_1 L_2 ) \,$ note: L_{1} and L_{2} do not touch each other whereas L_{3} touches both of the other loops.

$\Delta_1 = 1 \,$ note: the forward path touches all the loops so all that is left is 1.

$$G = \frac { G_1 \Delta_1 } { \Delta }   =  \frac { -y_{21} R_L } {1 + R_\text{in}y_{11} + R_L y_{22} - y_{21} R_L y_{12} R_\text{in} + R_\text{in}y_{11} R_L y_{22} }    \,$$

=== Digital IIR biquad filter ===
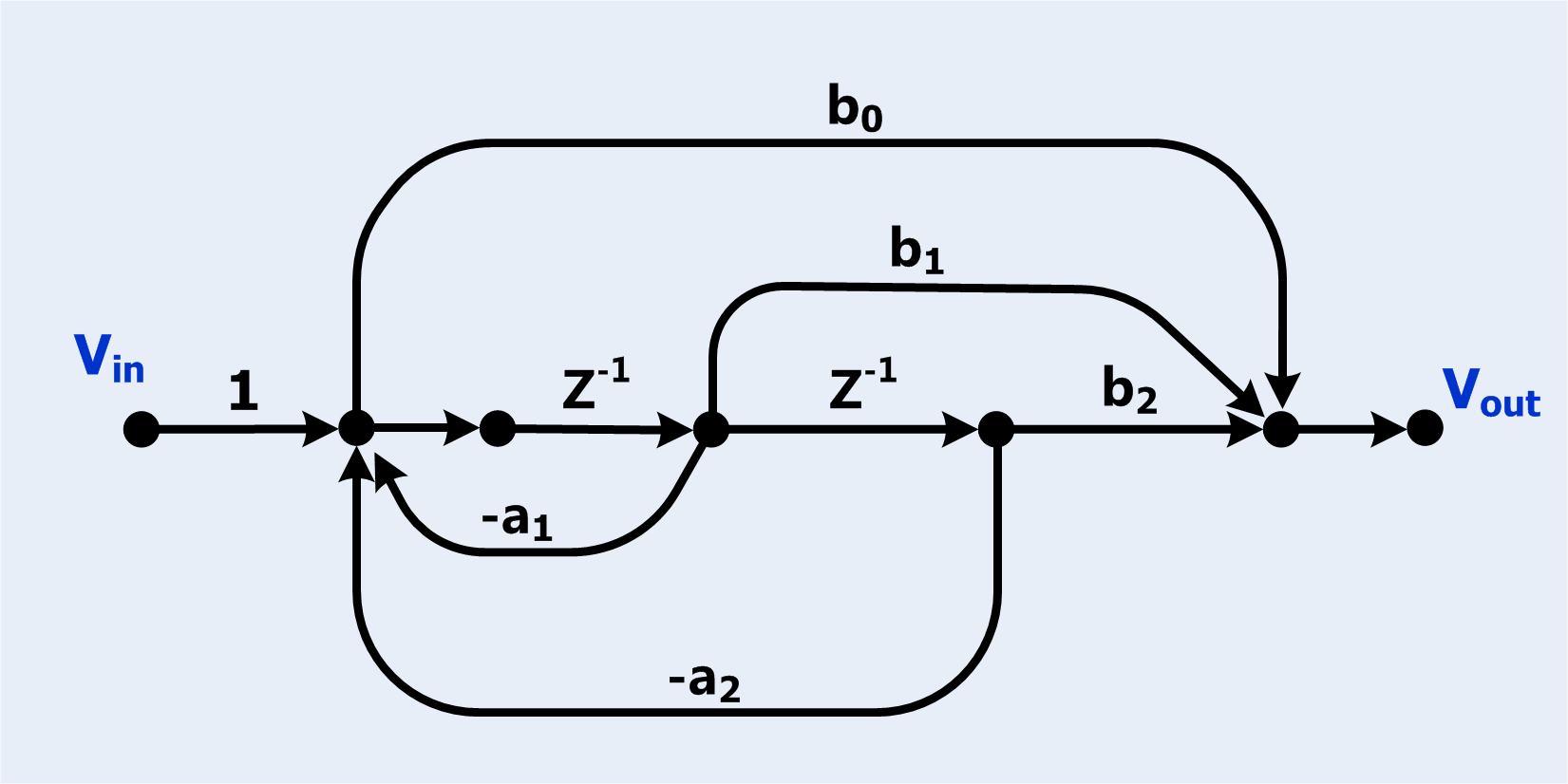
The signal flow graph (SFG) for a digital infinite impulse response bi-quad filter. This SFG has three forward paths and two loops.

Digital filters are often diagramed as signal flow graphs.

There are two loops
- $L_1 = -a_1 Z^{-1} \,$
- $L_2 = -a_2 Z^{-2} \,$

$\Delta = 1 - ( L_1 + L_2 ) \,$ Note, the two loops touch so there is no term for their product.

There are three forward paths
- $G_0 = b_0 \,$
- $G_1 = b_1 Z^{-1} \,$
- $G_2 = b_2 Z^{-2} \,$

All the forward paths touch all the loops so $\Delta_0 = \Delta_1 = \Delta_2 = 1 \,$

$$G = \frac { G_0 \Delta_0 +G_1 \Delta_1  + G_2 \Delta_2  } {\Delta} \,$$

$$G = \frac { b_0 + b_1 Z^{-1} + b_2 Z^{-2} } {1 +a_1 Z^{-1} + a_2 Z^{-2} } \,$$

=== Servo ===
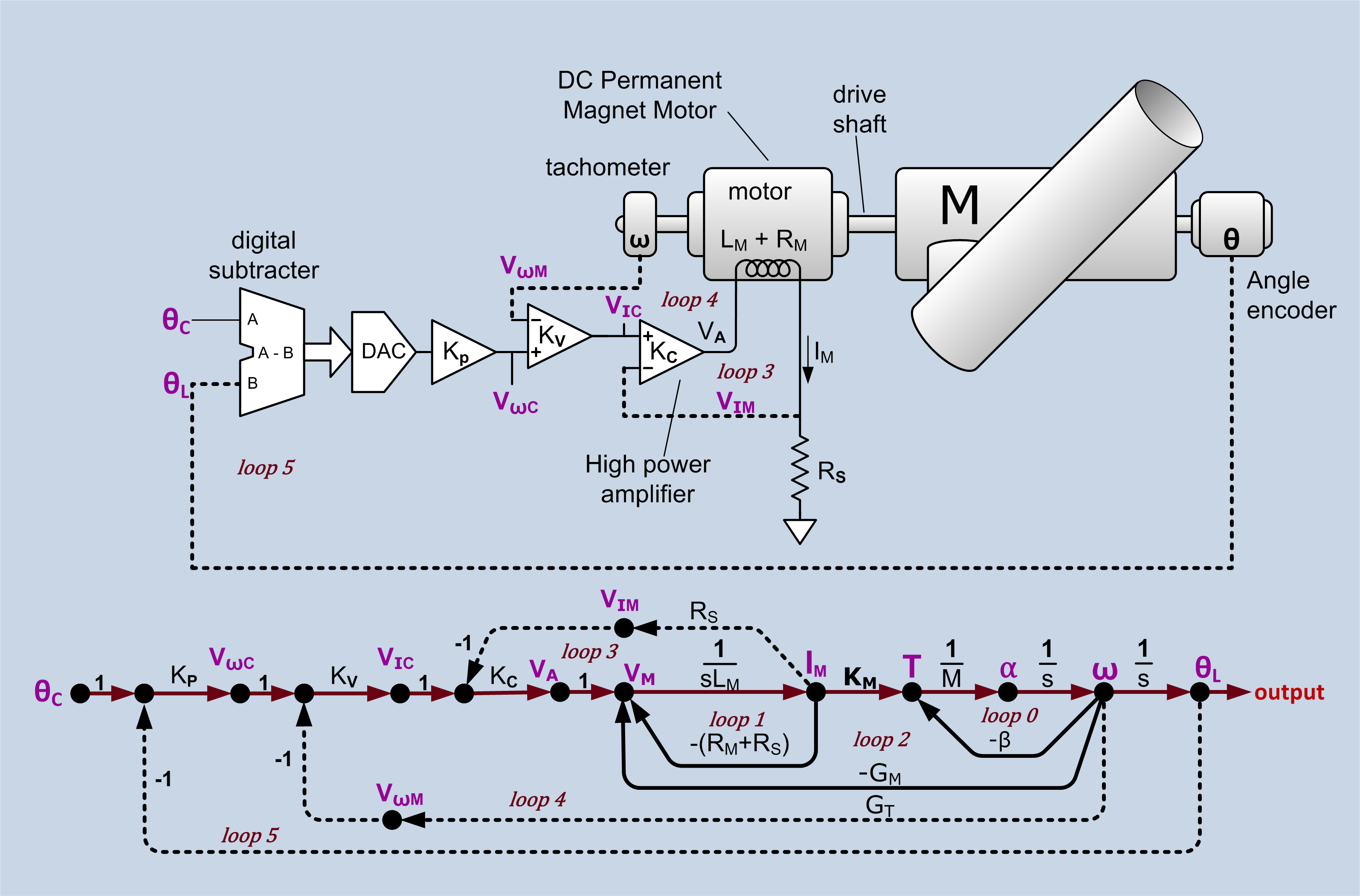
Angular position servo and signal flow graph. θ_{C} = desired angle command, θ_{L} = actual load angle, K_{P} = position loop gain, V_{ωC} = velocity command, V_{ωM} = motor velocity sense voltage, K_{V} = velocity loop gain, V_{IC} = current command, V_{IM} = current sense voltage, K_{C} = current loop gain, V_{A} = power amplifier output voltage, V_{M} = effective voltage across the inductance, L_{M} = motor inductance, I_{M} = motor current, R_{M} = motor resistance, R_{S} = current sense resistance, K_{M} = motor torque constant (Nm/amp), T = torque, M = moment of inertia of all rotating components α = angular acceleration, ω = angular velocity, β = mechanical damping, G_{M} = motor back EMF constant, G_{T} = tachometer conversion gain constant. There is one forward path (shown in a different color) and six feedback loops. The drive shaft assumed to be stiff enough to not treat as a spring. Constants are shown in black and variables in purple.

The signal flow graph has six loops. They are:

- $L_0 = - \frac {\beta} {sM} \,$

- $L_1 = \frac{-( R_M + R_S)} {sL_M} \,$

- $L_2 = \, \frac {-G_M K_M} {s^2 L_M M}$

- $L_3 = \frac {-K_C R_S} {sL_M} \,$

- $L_4 = \frac {-K_V K_C K_M G_T} {s^2 L_M M} \,$

- $L_5 = \frac {-K_P K_V K_C K_M } {s^3 L_M M} \,$

$$\Delta = 1 - (L_0+L_1+L_2+L_3+L_4+L_5) + (L_0 L_1 + L_0 L_3 )\,$$

There is one forward path:

- $g_0 = \frac {K_P K_V K_C K_M } {s^3 L_M M} \,$

The forward path touches all the loops therefore the co-factor $\Delta_0 = 1$

And the gain from input to output is $\frac {\theta_L} {\theta_C} = \frac {g_0 \Delta_0} {\Delta} \,$

== Equivalent matrix form ==
Mason's rule can be stated in a simple matrix form. Assume $\mathbf{T}$ is the transient matrix of the graph where $t_{nm} = \left[\mathbf{T}\right]_{nm}$ is the sum transmittance of branches from node m toward node n. Then, the gain from node m to node n of the graph is equal to $u_{nm} = \left[\mathbf{U}\right]_{nm}$, where

$$\mathbf{U} = \left ( \mathbf{I} - \mathbf{T} \right ) ^ {-1}$$,

and $\mathbf{I}$ is the identity matrix.

Mason's Rule is also particularly useful for deriving the z-domain transfer function of discrete networks that have inner feedback loops embedded within outer feedback loops (nested loops). If the discrete network can be drawn as a signal flow graph, then the application of Mason's Rule will give that network's z-domain H(z) transfer function.

== Complexity and computational applications ==
Mason's Rule can grow factorially, because the enumeration of paths in a directed graph grows dramatically. To see this consider the complete directed graph on $n$ vertices, having an edge between every pair of vertices. There is a path form $y_\text{in}$ to $y_\text{out}$ for each of the $(n-2)!$ permutations of the intermediate vertices. Thus Gaussian elimination is more efficient in the general case.

Yet Mason's rule characterizes the transfer functions of interconnected systems in a way which is simultaneously algebraic and combinatorial, allowing for general statements and other computations in algebraic systems theory. While numerous inverses occur during Gaussian elimination, Mason's rule naturally collects these into a single quasi-inverse. General form is

$$\frac{p}{1-q},$$

Where as described above, $q$ is a sum of cycle products, each of which typically falls into an ideal (for example, the strictly causal operators). Fractions of this form make a subring $R(1+\langle L_i\rangle)^{-1}$ of the rational function field. This observation carries over to the noncommutative case, even though Mason's rule itself must then be replaced by Riegle's rule.

== See also ==
- Signal-flow graph
- Riegle's rule
