= Graph Style Sheets =

Framework in mathematics and computing

GSS (Graph Style Sheets) in mathematics and computing, is an RDF (Resource Description Framework) vocabulary for representation of data in a model of labeled directed graph. Using it will make a relatively complex data resource modeled in RDF, much easier to understand by declaring simple styling and visibility instructions to be applied on selected resources, literals and properties.

== Introduction ==
GSS (Graph Style Sheets) are proposed in order to visually transform the graphs: filtering information, providing alternative layouts for specific elements, and using all available visual variables to encode information, so as to visualise data in a way that better lends itself to human perception. In summary, GSS (Graph Style Sheets) have been designed for the purpose of filtering, grouping and styling of information elements through specification of declarative transformation rules.

GSS not only associate styles to node-edge representation of RDF models, but also can be used to hide part of the graph and offer alternative layouts for some intended elements. The language lets you change the shape (including bitmap icons) of nodes in the graph, change font attributes or stroke properties, and group some or all properties associated with a resource in a table and sort them. A relatively complex RDF model declares styling and visibility instructions to be applied to selected resources and properties in order to improve readability.

== The GSS Language ==
GSS is a stylesheet language for styling data modeled in RDF and features a cascading mechanism. Its transformation model is loosely based on that of XSLT and its instructions resemble some existing W3C Recommendations such as CSS and SVG. In particular most of the GSS properties accept all values defined by the CSS 2 and SVG 1.0 Recommendations.

Any transformation rule of GSS is made of a selector-instruction pair. The left-hand side of a rule is called selector and the right-hand side is called the instruction. Such sets of rules are collected in a stylesheet (or several cascading stylesheets) and the application (a GSS engine) responsible for styling RDF model, evaluates relevant rules on data model (resources, literals and properties) while walking it; that is, if the selector of a rule matches a node (or edge) in the data model, its set of styling instructions are applied to that node (or edge). Conflicts between rules matching the same node (or edge) are resolved by giving different priority to rules in the stylesheets and most specific selector if conflicting rules are in the same stylesheet.

== Tools for manipulating GSS ==
IsaViz 2.0 is equipped with a GSS Editor, which lets you create stylesheets without writing a single line of RDF.
