= Coates graph =

Mathematical graph for solving linear systems

The Coates graph of matrix A

In mathematics, the Coates graph or Coates flow graph, named after C.L. Coates, is a graph associated with the Coates' method for the solution of a system of linear equations.

The Coates graph G_{c}(A) associated with an n × n matrix A is an n-node, weighted, labeled, directed graph. The nodes, labeled 1 through n, are each associated with the corresponding row/column of A. If entry a_{ji} ≠ 0 then there is a directed edge from node i to node j with weight a_{ji}. In other words, the Coates graph for matrix A is the one whose adjacency matrix is the transpose of A.

== See also ==
- Flow graph (mathematics)
- Mason graph
