= Samuel J. Mason =

American electronics engineer

- Born: 1921; New York City, New York
- Died: 1974 (aged 52–53)
- Education: Rutgers University; MIT
- Known for: Mason's invariant and Mason's rule
- Scientific career
- Workplaces: MIT
- Thesis: On the Logic of Feedback (1952)
- Doctoral advisor: Ernst Guillemin

Samuel Jefferson Mason (1921–1974) was an American electronics engineer. Mason's invariant and Mason's rule are named after him.

He was born in New York City, but he grew up in a small town in New Jersey. It was so small, in fact, that it only had a population of 26. He received a B.S. in electrical engineering from Rutgers University in 1942, and after graduation, he joined the Antenna Group of MIT Radiation Laboratory as a staff member. Mason went on to earn his S.M. and Ph.D. in electrical engineering from MIT in 1947 and 1952, respectively. After World War II, MIT's Research Laboratory of Electronics carried on much of the Rad Lab's research agenda in microwave electronics, and Mason became the associate director in 1967. Mason served on the faculty of MIT from 1949 until his death in 1974 – as an assistant professor in 1949, associate professor in 1954, and full professor in 1959. Mason unexpectedly died in 1974 due to a cerebral hemorrhage.

Mason's doctoral dissertation, supervised by Ernst Guillemin, was on signal-flow graphs and he is often credited with inventing them. Another one of his contributions to the field of control systems theory was a method to find the transfer function of a system, now known as Mason's rule. Mason was an expert in optical scanning systems for printed materials. He was the leader of the Cognitive Information Processing Group of the MIT Research Laboratory of Electronics, and he created systems that scanned printed materials and read them out loud for blind people, working with graduate student Bruce P. Golden, S.B. 1965 and S.M. 1966, on his thesis "Auditory Displays for Direct Translation Reading Machines." Similarly, he developed tactile devices powered by photocells that enabled blind people to sense light.

While at MIT, Mason was also responsible for revisions to the undergraduate curriculum in electrical engineering. He implemented innovations in the teaching of electric circuit theory by co-authoring a textbook on the subject, and he introduced digital signal analysis to undergraduates, which led to a textbook as well. Mason was also known to get students heavily involved in research, and he often had six or more doctoral candidates under his care. Mason also served his community as the chairman of the Faculty Committee on Student Environment, a member of the Faculty Committee on Education in the Face of Poverty and Segregation, and a leader of underprivileged youth in the Upward Bound program.
