= Mason's invariant =

Measure of transistor quality

In electronics, Mason's invariant, named after Samuel J. Mason, is a measure of the quality of transistors.

"When trying to solve a seemingly difficult problem, Sam said to concentrate on the easier ones first; the rest, including the hardest ones, will follow," recalled Andrew Viterbi, co-founder and former vice-president of Qualcomm. He had been a thesis advisee under Samuel Mason at MIT, and this was one lesson he especially remembered from his professor. A few years earlier, Mason had heeded his own advice when he defined a unilateral power gain for a linear two-port device, or U. After concentrating on easier problems with power gain in feedback amplifiers, a figure of merit for all three-terminal devices followed that is still used today as Mason's Invariant.

== Origin ==
In 1953, transistors were only five years old, and they were the only successful solid-state three-terminal active device. They were beginning to be used for RF applications, and they were limited to VHF frequencies and below. Mason wanted to find a figure of merit to compare transistors, and this led him to discover that the unilateral power gain of a linear two-port device was an invariant figure of merit.

In his paper Power Gain in Feedback Amplifiers published in 1953, Mason stated in his introduction,

"A vacuum tube, very often represented as a simple transconductance driving a passive impedance, may lead to relatively simple amplifier designs in which the input impedance (and hence the power gain) is effectively infinite, the voltage gain is the quantity of interest, and the input circuit is isolated from the load. The transistor, however, usually cannot be characterized so easily."

He wanted to find a metric to characterize and measure the quality of transistors since up until then, no such measure existed. His discovery turned out to have applications beyond transistors.

== Derivation of U ==
Mason first defined the device being studied with the three constraints listed below.

1. The device has only two ports (at which power can be transferred between it and outside devices).
2. The device is linear (in its relationships of currents and voltages at the two ports).
3. The device is used in a specified manner (connected as an amplifier between a linear one-port source and a linear one-port load).

Then, according to Madhu Gupta in Power Gain in Feedback Amplifiers, a Classic Revisited, Mason defined the problem as "being the search for device properties that are invariant with respect to transformations as represented by an embedding network" that satisfy the four constraints listed below.

1. The embedding network is a four-port.
2. The embedding network is linear.
3. The embedding network is lossless.
4. The embedding network is reciprocal.

He next showed that all transformations that satisfy the above constraints can be accomplished with just three simple transformations performed sequentially. Similarly, this is the same as representing an embedding network by a set of three embedding networks nested within one another. The three mathematical expressions can be seen below.

1. Reactance padding:
$$\begin{bmatrix}
Z'_{11} & Z'_{12} \\
Z'_{21} & Z'_{22}
\end{bmatrix}
=
\begin{bmatrix}
Z_{11}+jx_{11} & Z_{12}+jx_{12} \\
Z_{21}+jx_{21} & Z_{22}+jx_{22}
\end{bmatrix}$$

2. Real Transformations:
$$\begin{bmatrix}
Z'_{11} & Z'_{12} \\
Z'_{21} & Z'_{22}
\end{bmatrix}
=
\begin{bmatrix}
n_{11} & n_{12} \\
n_{21} & n_{22}
\end{bmatrix}
\begin{bmatrix}
Z_{11} & Z_{12} \\
Z_{21} & Z_{22}
\end{bmatrix}
\begin{bmatrix}
n_{11} & n_{12} \\
n_{21} & n_{22}
\end{bmatrix}$$

3. Inversion:
$$\begin{bmatrix}
Z'_{11} & Z'_{12} \\
Z'_{21} & Z'_{22}
\end{bmatrix}
=
\begin{bmatrix}
Z_{11} & Z_{12} \\
Z_{21} & Z_{22}
\end{bmatrix}^{-1}$$

Mason then considered which quantities remained invariant under each of these three transformations. His conclusions, listed respectively to the transformations above, are shown below. Each transformation left the values below unchanged.

1. Reactance padding: $\left [ Z-Z_{t} \right ]$ and $\left [ Z+Z^{*} \right ]$

2. Real transformations: $\left [ Z-Z_{t} \right ] \left [ Z+Z^{*} \right ]$ and $\dfrac{\det{\left [ Z-Z_{t} \right ]}}{\det{\left [ Z+Z^{*} \right ]}}$

3. Inversion: The magnitudes of the two determinants and the sign of the denominator in the above fraction remain unchanged in the inversion transformation. Consequently, the quantity invariant under all three conditions is:

$$\begin{align}
U & =\dfrac{|\det{\left [ Z-Z_t \right ]}|}{\det{\left [ Z+Z^{*} \right ]}} \\
& =
\dfrac{|Z_{12}-Z_{21}|^{2}}{4 (\operatorname{Re}[Z_{11}] Re[Z_{22}]-\operatorname{Re}[Z_{12}] \operatorname{Re}[Z_{21}])} \\
& =
\dfrac{|Y_{21}-Y_{12}|^{2}}{4 (\operatorname{Re}[Y_{11}] \operatorname{Re}[Y_{22}]-\operatorname{Re}[Y_{12}] \operatorname{Re}[Y_{21}])}
\end{align}$$

== Importance ==
Mason's Invariant, or U, is the only device characteristic that is invariant under lossless, reciprocal embeddings. In other words, U can be used as a figure of merit to compare any two-port active device (which includes three-terminal devices used as two-ports). For example, a factory producing BJTs can calculate U of the transistors it is producing and compare their quality to the other BJTs on the market. Furthermore, U can be used as an indicator of activity. If U is greater than one, the two-port device is active; otherwise, that device is passive. This is especially useful in the microwave engineering community. Though originally published in a circuit theory journal, Mason's paper becomes especially relevant to microwave engineers since U is usually slightly greater than or equal to one in the microwave frequency range. When U is smaller than or considerably larger than one, it becomes relatively useless.

While Mason's Invariant can be used as a figure of merit across all operating frequencies, its value at ƒ_{max} is especially useful. ƒ_{max} is the maximum oscillation frequency of a device, and it is discovered when $U(f_\max) = 1$. This frequency is also the frequency at which the maximum stable gain G_{ms} and the maximum available gain G_{ma} of the device become one. Consequently, ƒ_{max} is a characteristic of the device, and it has the significance that it is the maximum frequency of oscillation in a circuit where only one active device is present, the device is embedded in a passive network, and only single sinusoidal signals are of interest.

== Conclusion ==
In his revisit of Mason's paper, Gupta states, "Perhaps the most convincing evidence of the utility of the concept of a unilateral power gain as a device figure of merit is the fact that for the last three decades, practically every new, active, two-port device developed for high frequency use has been carefully scrutinized for the achievable value of U..." This assumption is appropriate because "U_{max}" or "maximum unilateral gain" is still listed on transistor specification sheets, and Mason's Invariant is still taught in some undergraduate electrical engineering curricula. Though now it has been over five decades, Mason's finding of an invariant device characteristic still plays a significant role in transistor design.

== See also ==
- Scattering parameters
