= Directed graph =

Graph with oriented edges

A directed graph

In mathematics, and more specifically in graph theory, a directed graph (or digraph) is a graph that is made up of a set of vertices connected by directed edges, often called arcs.

== Definition ==
In formal terms, a directed graph is an ordered pair G = (V, A) where

- V is a set whose elements are called vertices, nodes, or points;
- A is a set of ordered pairs of vertices, called arcs, directed edges (sometimes simply edges with the corresponding set named E instead of A), arrows, or directed lines.

It differs from an ordinary or undirected graph, in that the latter is defined in terms of unordered pairs of vertices, which are usually called edges, links or lines.

The aforementioned definition does not allow a directed graph to have multiple arrows with the same source and target nodes, but some authors consider a broader definition that allows directed graphs to have such multiple arcs (namely, they allow the arc set to be a multiset). Sometimes these entities are called directed multigraphs (or multidigraphs).
On the other hand, the aforementioned definition allows a directed graph to have loops (that is, arcs that directly connect nodes with themselves), but some authors consider a narrower definition that does not allow directed graphs to have loops. Directed graphs without loops may be called simple directed graphs, while directed graphs with loops may be called loop-digraphs (see section Types of directed graph).

== Types of directed graphs ==
=== Subclasses ===
A simple directed acyclic graph

A tournament on 4 vertices

- Symmetric directed graphs are directed graphs where all edges appear twice, one in each direction (that is, for every arrow that belongs to the digraph, the corresponding inverse arrow also belongs to it). (Such an edge is sometimes called "bidirected" and such graphs are sometimes called "bidirected", but this conflicts with the meaning for bidirected graphs.)
- Simple directed graphs are directed graphs that have no loops (arrows that directly connect vertices to themselves) and no multiple arrows with same source and target nodes. As already introduced, in case of multiple arrows the entity is usually addressed as directed multigraph. Some authors describe digraphs with loops as loop-digraphs.
  - Complete directed graphs are simple directed graphs where each pair of vertices is joined by a symmetric pair of directed arcs (it is equivalent to an undirected complete graph with the edges replaced by pairs of inverse arcs). It follows that a complete digraph is symmetric.
  - Semicomplete multipartite digraphs are simple digraphs in which the vertex set is partitioned into sets such that for every pair of vertices x and y in different sets, there is an arc between x and y. There can be one arc between x and y or two arcs in opposite directions.
  - Semicomplete digraphs are simple digraphs where there is an arc between each pair of vertices. Every semicomplete digraph is a semicomplete multipartite digraph in a trivial way, with each vertex constituting a set of the partition.
  - Quasi-transitive digraphs are simple digraphs where for every triple x, y, z of distinct vertices with arcs from x to y and from y to z, there is an arc between x and z. There can be just one arc between x and z or two arcs in opposite directions. A semicomplete digraph is a quasi-transitive digraph. There are extensions of quasi-transitive digraphs called k-quasi-transitive digraphs.
  - Oriented graphs are directed graphs having no opposite pairs of directed edges (i.e. at most one of (x, y) and (y, x) may be arrows of the graph). It follows that a directed graph is an oriented graph if and only if it has no 2-cycle. Such a graph can be obtained by applying an orientation to an undirected graph.
    - Tournaments are oriented graphs obtained by choosing a direction for each edge in undirected complete graphs. A tournament is a semicomplete digraph.
    - A directed graph is acyclic if it has no directed cycles. The usual name for such a digraph is directed acyclic graph (DAG).
      - Multitrees are DAGs in which there are no two distinct directed paths from the same starting vertex to the same ending vertex.
      - Oriented trees or polytrees are DAGs formed by orienting the edges of trees (connected, acyclic undirected graphs).
        - Rooted trees are oriented trees in which all edges of the underlying undirected tree are directed either away from or towards the root (they are called, respectively, arborescences or out-trees, and in-trees.

=== Digraphs with supplementary properties ===
- Weighted directed graphs (also known as directed networks) are (simple) directed graphs with weights assigned to their arrows, similarly to weighted graphs (which are also known as undirected networks or weighted networks).
  - Flow networks are weighted directed graphs where two nodes are distinguished, a source and a sink.
- Rooted directed graphs (also known as flow graphs) are digraphs in which a vertex has been distinguished as the root.
  - Control-flow graphs are rooted digraphs used in computer science as a representation of the paths that might be traversed through a program during its execution.
- Signal-flow graphs are directed graphs in which nodes represent system variables and branches (edges, arcs, or arrows) represent functional connections between pairs of nodes.
- Flow graphs are digraphs associated with a set of linear algebraic or differential equations.
- State diagrams are directed multigraphs that represent finite-state machines.
- Commutative diagrams are digraphs used in category theory, where the vertices represent (mathematical) objects and the arrows represent morphisms, with the property that all directed paths with the same start and endpoints lead to the same result by composition.
- In the theory of Lie groups, a quiver Q is a directed graph serving as the domain of, and thus characterizing the shape of, a representation V defined as a functor, specifically an object of the functor category FinVct_{K}^{F(Q)} where F(Q) is the free category on Q consisting of paths in Q and FinVct_{K} is the category of finite-dimensional vector spaces over a field K. Representations of a quiver label its vertices with vector spaces and its edges (and hence paths) compatibly with linear transformations between them, and transform via natural transformations.

== Basic terminology ==
Oriented graph with corresponding incidence matrix

An arc (x, y) is considered to be directed from x to y; y is called the head and x is called the tail of the arc; y is said to be a direct successor of x and x is said to be a direct predecessor of y. If a path leads from x to y, then y is said to be a successor of x and reachable from x, and x is said to be a predecessor of y. The arc (y, x) is called the reversed arc of (x, y).

The adjacency matrix of a multidigraph with loops is the integer-valued matrix with rows and columns corresponding to the vertices, where a nondiagonal entry a_{ij} is the number of arcs from vertex i to vertex j, and the diagonal entry a_{ii} is the number of loops at vertex i. The adjacency matrix of a directed graph is a logical matrix, and is unique up to permutation of rows and columns.

Another matrix representation for a directed graph is its incidence matrix.

See direction for more definitions.

== Indegree and outdegree ==
A directed graph with vertices labeled (indegree, outdegree)

For a vertex, the number of head ends adjacent to a vertex is called the indegree of the vertex and the number of tail ends adjacent to a vertex is its outdegree (called branching factor in trees).

Let G = (V, E) and v ∈ V. The indegree of v is denoted deg^{−}(v) and its outdegree is denoted deg^{+}(v).

A vertex with deg^{−}(v) = 0 is called a source, as it is the origin of each of its outgoing arcs. Similarly, a vertex with deg^{+}(v) = 0 is called a sink, since it is the end of each of its incoming arcs.

The degree sum formula states that, for a directed graph,

$$\sum_{v \in V} \deg^-(v) = \sum_{v \in V} \deg^+(v) = |E|.$$

If for every vertex v ∈ V, deg^{+}(v) = deg^{−}(v), the graph is called a balanced directed graph.

== Degree sequence ==
The degree sequence of a directed graph is the list of its indegree and outdegree pairs; for the above example we have degree sequence ((2, 0), (2, 2), (0, 2), (1, 1)). The degree sequence is a directed graph invariant so isomorphic directed graphs have the same degree sequence. However, the degree sequence does not, in general, uniquely identify a directed graph; in some cases, non-isomorphic digraphs have the same degree sequence.

The directed graph realization problem is the problem of finding a directed graph with the degree sequence a given sequence of positive integer pairs. (Trailing pairs of zeros may be ignored since they are trivially realized by adding an appropriate number of isolated vertices to the directed graph.) A sequence which is the degree sequence of some directed graph, i.e. for which the directed graph realization problem has a solution, is called a directed graphic or directed graphical sequence. This problem can either be solved by the Kleitman–Wang algorithm or by the Fulkerson–Chen–Anstee theorem.

== Directed graph connectivity ==
A directed graph is weakly connected (or just connected) if the undirected underlying graph obtained by replacing all directed edges of the graph with undirected edges is a connected graph.

A directed graph is strongly connected or strong if it contains a directed path from x to y (and from y to x) for every pair of vertices (x, y). The strong components are the maximal strongly connected subgraphs.

A connected rooted graph (or flow graph) is one where there exists a directed path to every vertex from a distinguished root vertex.

== See also ==
- Binary relation – Relationship between elements of two sets
- Coates graph – Mathematical graph for solving linear systems
- Directed Graph Markup Language
- DRAKON flowchart – Algorithm mapping tool
- Flow chart – Diagram that represents a workflow or process
- Globular set
- Glossary of graph theory
- Graph database – Database using graph structures for queries
- Graph Style Sheets – Framework in mathematics and computing
- Graph theory – Area of discrete mathematics
- Graph (abstract data type) – Abstract data type in computer science
- Network theory – Study of graphs as a representation of relations between discrete objects
- Orientation (graph theory) – Assigning directions to the edges of an undirected graph
- Preorder – Reflexive and transitive binary relation
- Topological sorting – Node ordering for directed acyclic graphs
- Transpose graph – Directed graph with reversed edges
- Vertical constraint graph
- Zero-weight cycle problem
