= Single stage =

Single stage may refer to:

- Single stage game, a non-repeated extensive form game
- Single-stage-to-orbit, a vehicle which reaches orbit from the surface of a body without jettisoning hardware
- Single-stage transistor amplifier, a negative feedback amplifier
- Single-stage incubation method, a method of incubation of eggs
