= Extra element theorem =

Circuit theorem

The Extra Element Theorem (EET) is an analytic technique developed by R. D. Middlebrook for simplifying the process of deriving driving point and transfer functions for linear electronic circuits. Much like Thévenin's theorem, the extra element theorem breaks down one complicated problem into several simpler ones.

Driving point and transfer functions can generally be found using Kirchhoff's circuit laws. However, several complicated equations may result that offer little insight into the circuit's behavior. Using the extra element theorem, a circuit element (such as a resistor) can be removed from a circuit, and the desired driving point or transfer function is found. By removing the element that most complicate the circuit (such as an element that creates feedback), the desired function can be easier to obtain. Next, two correctional factors must be found and combined with the previously derived function to find the exact expression.

The general form of the extra element theorem is called the N-extra element theorem and allows multiple circuit elements to be removed at once.

== General formulation ==
The (single) extra element theorem expresses any transfer function as a product of the transfer function with that element removed and a correction factor. The correction factor term consists of the impedance of the extra element and two driving point impedances seen by the extra element: The double null injection driving point impedance and the single injection driving point impedance. Because an extra element can be removed in general by either short-circuiting or open-circuiting the element, there are two equivalent forms of the EET:
$$H(s) = H_{\infty}(s) \frac{1 + \frac{Z_n(s)}{Z(s)}}{1 + \frac{Z_d(s)}{Z(s)}}$$
or,
$$H(s) = H_0(s)\frac{1 + \frac{Z(s)}{Z_n(s)}}{1 + \frac{Z(s)}{Z_d(s)}} .$$

Where the Laplace-domain transfer functions and impedances in the above expressions are defined as follows: H(s) is the transfer function with the extra element present. H_{∞}(s) is the transfer function with the extra element open-circuited. H_{0}(s) is the transfer function with the extra element short-circuited. Z(s) is the impedance of the extra element. Z_{d}(s) is the single-injection driving point impedance "seen" by the extra element. Z_{n}(s) is the double-null-injection driving point impedance "seen" by the extra element.

The extra element theorem incidentally proves that any electric circuit transfer function can be expressed as no more than a bilinear function of any particular circuit element.

== Driving point impedances ==
=== Single Injection Driving Point Impedance ===
Z_{d}(s) is found by making the input to the system's transfer function zero (short circuit a voltage source or open circuit a current source) and determining the impedance across the terminals to which the extra element will be connected with the extra element absent. This impedance is same as the Thévenin's equivalent impedance.

=== Double Null Injection Driving Point Impedance ===
Z_{n}(s) is found by replacing the extra element with a second test signal source (either a current source or voltage source as appropriate). Then, Z_{n}(s) is defined as the ratio of voltage across the terminals of this second test source to the current leaving its positive terminal when the output of the system's transfer function is nulled for any value of the primary input to the system's transfer function.

In practice, Z_{n}(s) can be found from working backward from the facts that the output of the transfer function is made zero and that the primary input to the transfer function is unknown. Then using conventional circuit analysis techniques to express both the voltage across the extra element test source's terminals, v_{n}(s), and the current leaving the extra element test source's positive terminals, i_{n}(s), and calculating $Z_n(s) = v_n(s) / i_n(s)$. Although the computation of Z_{n}(s) is an unfamiliar process for many engineers, its expressions are often much simpler than those for Z_{d}(s) because the nulling of the transfer function's output often leads to other voltages/currents in the circuit being zero, which may allow exclusion of certain components from analysis.

== Special case with transfer function as a self-impedance ==
As a special case, the EET can be used to find the input impedance of a network with the addition of an element designated as "extra". In this case, Z_{d} is the same as the impedance of the input test current source signal made zero or equivalently with the input open circuited. Likewise, since the transfer function output signal can be considered to be the voltage at the input terminals, Z_{n} is found when the input voltage is zero i.e. the input terminals are short-circuited. Thus, for this particular application, the EET can be written as:
$$Z_\text{in} = Z^{\infty}_\text{in} \cdot \frac{1+\frac{Z^0_{e}}{Z}}{1+\frac{Z^{\infty}_{e}}{Z}}$$
where

- $Z$ is the impedance chosen as the extra element
- $Z^{\infty}_\text{in}$ is the input impedance with Z removed (or made infinite)
- $Z^0_{e}$ is the impedance seen by the extra element Z with the input shorted (or made zero)
- $Z^{\infty}_{e}$ is the impedance seen by the extra element Z with the input open (or made infinite)

Computing these three terms may seem like extra effort, but they are often easier to compute than the overall input impedance.

=== Example ===
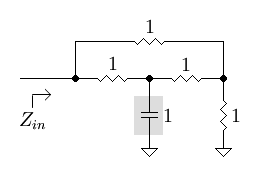
Figure 1: Simple RC circuit to demonstrate the EET. The capacitor (gray shading) is denoted the extra element

Consider the problem of finding $Z_{in}$ for the circuit in Figure 1 using the EET (note all component values are unity for simplicity). If the capacitor (gray shading) is denoted the extra element then
$$Z = \frac{1}{s}.$$

Removing this capacitor from the circuit,
$$Z^{\infty}_{in} = 2\|1 +1 = \frac{5}{3}.$$

Calculating the impedance seen by the capacitor with the input shorted,
$$Z^0_{e} = 1\|(1+1\|1) = \frac{3}{5}.$$

Calculating the impedance seen by the capacitor with the input open,
$$Z^{\infty}_{e} = 2\|1+1 = \frac{5}{3}.$$

Therefore, using the EET,
$$Z_{in} = \frac{5}{3} \cdot \frac{1+\frac{3}{5}s}{1+\frac{5}{3}s} = \frac{5+3s}{3+5s}.$$

This problem was solved by calculating three simple driving point impedances by inspection.

== Feedback amplifiers ==
The EET is also useful for analyzing single and multi-loop feedback amplifiers. In this case, the EET can take the form of the asymptotic gain model.

== See also ==
- Asymptotic gain model
- Blackman's theorem
- Return ratio
- Signal-flow graph
