= Asymptotic gain model =

The asymptotic gain model (also known as the Rosenstark method) is a representation of the gain of negative feedback amplifiers given by the asymptotic gain relation:

$$G = G_{\infty} \left( \frac{T}{T + 1} \right) + G_0 \left( \frac{1}{T + 1} \right) \ ,$$

where $T$ is the return ratio with the input source disabled (equal to the negative of the loop gain in the case of a single-loop system composed of unilateral blocks), G_{∞} is the asymptotic gain and G_{0} is the direct transmission term. This form for the gain can provide intuitive insight into the circuit and often is easier to derive than a direct attack on the gain.

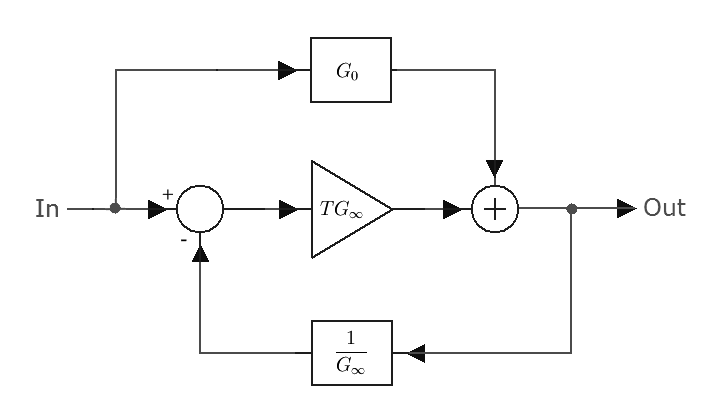
Figure 1: Block diagram for asymptotic gain model

Figure 1 shows a block diagram that leads to the asymptotic gain expression. The asymptotic gain relation also can be expressed as a signal flow graph. See Figure 2. The asymptotic gain model is a special case of the extra element theorem.

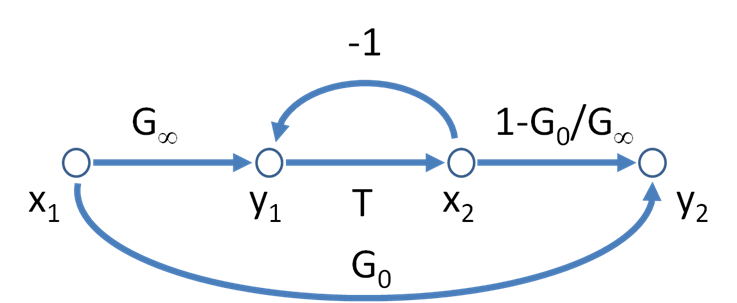
Figure 2: Possible equivalent signal-flow graph for the asymptotic gain model

As follows directly from limiting cases of the gain expression, the asymptotic gain G_{∞} is simply the gain of the system when the return ratio approaches infinity:

$$G_{\infty} = G\ \Big |_{T \rightarrow \infty}\ ,$$

while the direct transmission term G_{0} is the gain of the system when the return ratio is zero:

$$G_{0} = G\ \Big |_{T \rightarrow 0}\ .$$

== Advantages ==
- This model is useful because it completely characterizes feedback amplifiers, including loading effects and the bilateral properties of amplifiers and feedback networks.
- Often feedback amplifiers are designed such that the return ratio T is much greater than unity. In this case, and assuming the direct transmission term G_{0} is small (as it often is), the gain G of the system is approximately equal to the asymptotic gain G_{∞}.
- The asymptotic gain is (usually) only a function of passive elements in a circuit, and can often be found by inspection.
- The feedback topology (series-series, series-shunt, etc.) need not be identified beforehand as the analysis is the same in all cases.

== Implementation ==
Direct application of the model involves these steps:

1. Select a dependent source in the circuit.
2. Find the return ratio for that source.
3. Find the gain G_{∞} directly from the circuit by replacing the circuit with one corresponding to T = ∞.
4. Find the gain G_{0} directly from the circuit by replacing the circuit with one corresponding to T = 0.
5. Substitute the values for T, G_{∞} and G_{0} into the asymptotic gain formula.

These steps can be implemented directly in SPICE using the small-signal circuit of hand analysis. In this approach the dependent sources of the devices are readily accessed. In contrast, for experimental measurements using real devices or SPICE simulations using numerically generated device models with inaccessible dependent sources, evaluating the return ratio requires special methods.

== Connection with classical feedback theory ==
Classical feedback theory neglects feedforward (G_{0}). If feedforward is dropped, the gain from the asymptotic gain model becomes

$$G = G_{\infin} \frac {T} {1+T} =\frac {G_{\infin}T}{1+\frac{1} {G_{\infin}} G_{\infin} T} \ ,$$

while in classical feedback theory, in terms of the open loop gain A, the gain with feedback (closed loop gain) is:

$$A_\mathrm{FB} = \frac {A} {1 + {\beta}_\mathrm{FB} A} \ .$$

Comparison of the two expressions indicates the feedback factor β_{FB} is:

$$\beta_\mathrm{FB} = \frac {1} {G_{\infin}} \ ,$$

while the open-loop gain is:

$$A = G_{\infin} \ T \ .$$

If the accuracy is adequate (usually it is), these formulas suggest an alternative evaluation of T: evaluate the open-loop gain and G_{∞} and use these expressions to find T. Often these two evaluations are easier than evaluation of T directly.

== Examples ==
The steps in deriving the gain using the asymptotic gain formula are outlined below for two negative feedback amplifiers. The single transistor example shows how the method works in principle for a transconductance amplifier, while the second two-transistor example shows the approach to more complex cases using a current amplifier.

=== Single-stage transistor amplifier ===
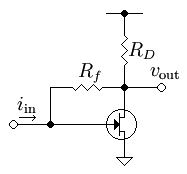
Figure 3: FET feedback amplifier

Consider the simple FET feedback amplifier in Figure 3. The aim is to find the low-frequency, open-circuit, transresistance gain of this circuit G = v_{out} / i_{in} using the asymptotic gain model.

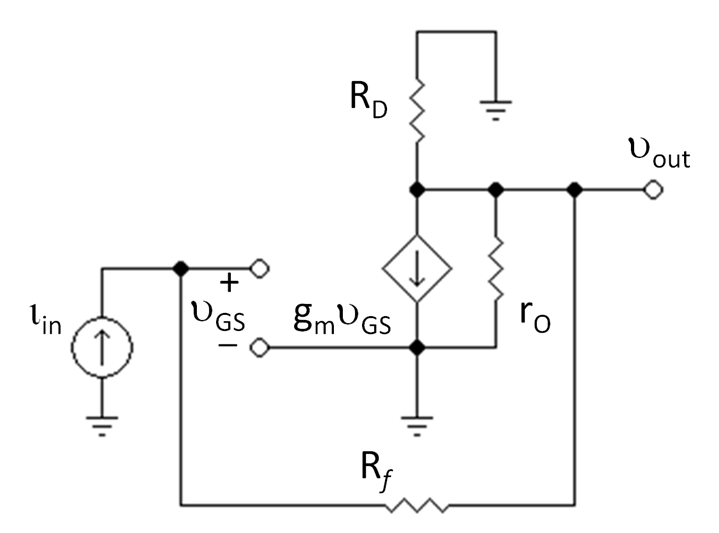
Figure 4: Small-signal circuit for transresistance amplifier; the feedback resistor R_{f} is placed below the amplifier to resemble the standard topology

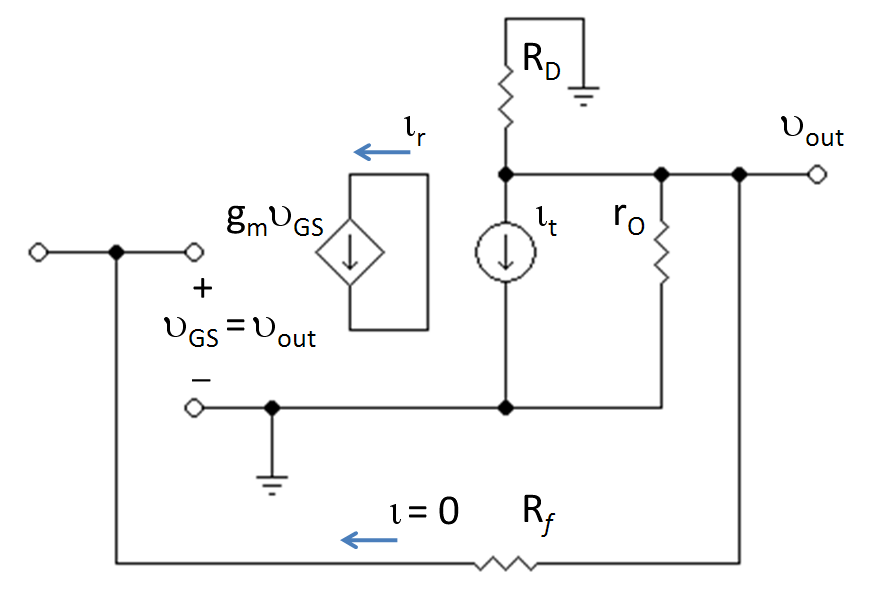
Figure 5: Small-signal circuit with return path broken and test voltage driving amplifier at the break

The small-signal equivalent circuit is shown in Figure 4, where the transistor is replaced by its hybrid-pi model.

==== Return ratio ====
It is most straightforward to begin by finding the return ratio T, because G_{0} and G_{∞} are defined as limiting forms of the gain as T tends to either zero or infinity. To take these limits, it is necessary to know what parameters T depends upon. There is only one dependent source in this circuit, so as a starting point the return ratio related to this source is determined as outlined in the article on return ratio.

The return ratio is found using Figure 5. In Figure 5, the input current source is set to zero, By cutting the dependent source out of the output side of the circuit, and short-circuiting its terminals, the output side of the circuit is isolated from the input and the feedback loop is broken. A test current i_{t} replaces the dependent source. Then the return current generated in the dependent source by the test current is found. The return ratio is then T = −i_{r} / i_{t}. Using this method, and noticing that R_{D} is in parallel with r_{O}, T is determined as:

$$T = g_\mathrm{m} \left( R_\mathrm{D}\ ||r_\mathrm{O} \right) \approx g_\mathrm{m} R_\mathrm{D} \ ,$$

where the approximation is accurate in the common case where r_{O} >> R_{D}. With this relationship it is clear that the limits T → 0, or ∞ are realized if we let transconductance g_{m} → 0, or ∞.

==== Asymptotic gain ====
Finding the asymptotic gain G_{∞} provides insight, and usually can be done by inspection. To find G_{∞} we let g_{m} → ∞ and find the resulting gain. The drain current, i_{D} = g_{m} v_{GS}, must be finite. Hence, as g_{m} approaches infinity, v_{GS} also must approach zero. As the source is grounded, v_{GS} = 0 implies v_{G} = 0 as well. With v_{G} = 0 and the fact that all the input current flows through R_{f} (as the FET has an infinite input impedance), the output voltage is simply −i_{in} R_{f}. Hence

$$G_{\infty} = \frac{v_\mathrm{out}}{i_\mathrm{in}} = -R_\mathrm{f}\ .$$

Alternatively G_{∞} is the gain found by replacing the transistor by an ideal amplifier with infinite gain - a nullor.

==== Direct feedthrough ====
To find the direct feedthrough $G_0$ we simply let g_{m} → 0 and compute the resulting gain. The currents through R_{f} and the parallel combination of R_{D} || r_{O} must therefore be the same and equal to i_{in}. The output voltage is therefore i_{in} (R_{D} || r_{O}).

Hence

$$G_0 = \frac{v_{out}}{i_{in}} = R_D\|r_O \approx R_D \ ,$$

where the approximation is accurate in the common case where r_{O} >> R_{D}.

==== Overall gain ====
The overall transresistance gain of this amplifier is therefore:

$$G = \frac{v_{out}}{i_{in}} = -R_f \frac{g_m R_D}{1+g_m R_D} + R_D \frac{1}{1+g_m R_D} = \frac{R_D\left(1-g_m R_f\right)}{1+g_m R_D}\ .$$

Examining this equation, it appears to be advantageous to make R_{D} large in order make the overall gain approach the asymptotic gain, which makes the gain insensitive to amplifier parameters (g_{m} and R_{D}). In addition, a large first term reduces the importance of the direct feedthrough factor, which degrades the amplifier. One way to increase R_{D} is to replace this resistor by an active load, for example, a current mirror.

Figure 6: Two-transistor feedback amplifier; any source impedance R_{S} is lumped in with the base resistor R_{B}.

=== Two-stage transistor amplifier ===
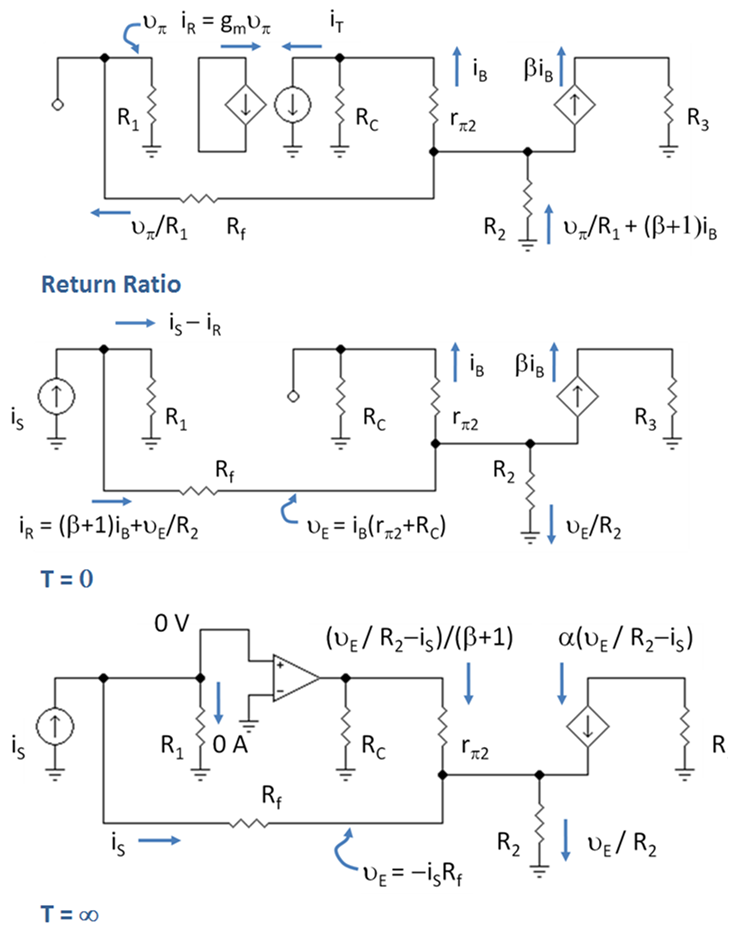
Figure 7: Schematics for using asymptotic gain model; parameter α = β / ( β+1 ); resistor R_{C} = R_{C1}.

Figure 6 shows a two-transistor amplifier with a feedback resistor R_{f}. This amplifier is often referred to as a shunt-series feedback amplifier, and analyzed on the basis that resistor R_{2} is in series with the output and samples output current, while R_{f} is in shunt (parallel) with the input and subtracts from the input current. See the article on negative feedback amplifier and references by Meyer or Sedra. That is, the amplifier uses current feedback. It frequently is ambiguous just what type of feedback is involved in an amplifier, and the asymptotic gain approach has the advantage/disadvantage that it works whether or not you understand the circuit.

Figure 6 indicates the output node, but does not indicate the choice of output variable. In what follows, the output variable is selected as the short-circuit current of the amplifier, that is, the collector current of the output transistor. Other choices for output are discussed later.

To implement the asymptotic gain model, the dependent source associated with either transistor can be used. Here the first transistor is chosen.

==== Return ratio ====
The circuit to determine the return ratio is shown in the top panel of Figure 7. Labels show the currents in the various branches as found using a combination of Ohm's law and Kirchhoff's laws. Resistor R_{1} = R_{B} // r_{π1} and R_{3} = R_{C2} // R_{L}. KVL from the ground of R_{1} to the ground of R_{2} provides:

$$i_\mathrm{B} = -v_{ \pi} \frac {1+R_2/R_1+R_\mathrm{f}/R_1} {(\beta +1) R_2} \ .$$

KVL provides the collector voltage at the top of R_{C} as

$$v_\mathrm{C} = v_{ \pi} \left(1+ \frac {R_\mathrm{f}} {R_1} \right ) -i_\mathrm{B} r_{ \pi 2} \ .$$

Finally, KCL at this collector provides

$$i_\mathrm{T} = i_\mathrm{B} - \frac {v_\mathrm{C}} {R_\mathrm{C}} \ .$$

Substituting the first equation into the second and the second into the third, the return ratio is found as

$T = - \frac {i_\mathrm{R}} {i_\mathrm{T}} = -g_\mathrm{m} \frac {v_{ \pi} }{i_\mathrm{T}}$

$$= \frac {g_\mathrm{m} R_\mathrm{C}} { \left( 1 + \frac {R_\mathrm{f}} {R_1} \right) \left( 1+ \frac {R_\mathrm{C}+r_{ \pi 2}}{( \beta +1)R_2} \right) +\frac {R_\mathrm{C}+r_{ \pi 2}}{(\beta +1)R_1} } \ .$$

==== Gain G_{0} with T = 0 ====
The circuit to determine G_{0} is shown in the center panel of Figure 7. In Figure 7, the output variable is the output current βi_{B} (the short-circuit load current), which leads to the short-circuit current gain of the amplifier, namely βi_{B} / i_{S}:

$$G_0 = \frac { \beta i_B} {i_S} \ .$$

Using Ohm's law, the voltage at the top of R_{1} is found as

$$( i_S - i_R ) R_1 = i_R R_f +v_E \ \ ,$$

or, rearranging terms,

$$i_S = i_R \left( 1 + \frac {R_f}{R_1} \right) +\frac {v_E} {R_1} \ .$$

Using KCL at the top of R_{2}:

$$i_R = \frac {v_E} {R_2} + ( \beta +1 ) i_B \ .$$

Emitter voltage v_{E} already is known in terms of i_{B} from the diagram of Figure 7. Substituting the second equation in the first, i_{B} is determined in terms of i_{S} alone, and G_{0} becomes:

$$G_0 = \frac { \beta } {
( \beta +1) \left( 1 + \frac{R_f}{R_1} \right ) +(r_{ \pi 2} +R_C ) \left[ \frac {1} {R_1} + \frac {1} {R_2} \left( 1 + \frac {R_f} {R_1} \right ) \right]
}$$

Gain G_{0} represents feedforward through the feedback network, and commonly is negligible.

==== Gain G_{∞} with T → ∞ ====
The circuit to determine G_{∞} is shown in the bottom panel of Figure 7. The introduction of the ideal op amp (a nullor) in this circuit is explained as follows. When T → ∞, the gain of the amplifier goes to infinity as well, and in such a case the differential voltage driving the amplifier (the voltage across the input transistor r_{π1}) is driven to zero and (according to Ohm's law when there is no voltage) it draws no input current. On the other hand, the output current and output voltage are whatever the circuit demands. This behavior is like a nullor, so a nullor can be introduced to represent the infinite gain transistor.

The current gain is read directly off the schematic:

$$G_{ \infty } = \frac { \beta i_B } {i_S} = \left( \frac {\beta} {\beta +1} \right) \left( 1 + \frac {R_f} {R_2} \right) \ .$$

==== Comparison with classical feedback theory ====
Using the classical model, the feed-forward is neglected and the feedback factor β_{FB} is (assuming transistor β >> 1):

$$\beta_{FB} = \frac {1} {G_{\infin}} \approx \frac {1} {(1+ \frac {R_f}{R_2} )} = \frac {R_2} {(R_f + R_2)} \ ,$$

and the open-loop gain A is:

$$A = G_{\infin}T \approx \frac {\left( 1+\frac {R_f}{R_2} \right) g_m R_C} { \left( 1 + \frac {R_f} {R_1} \right) \left( 1+ \frac {R_C+r_{ \pi 2}}{( \beta +1)R_2} \right) +\frac {R_C+r_{ \pi 2}}{(\beta +1)R_1} } \ .$$

==== Overall gain ====
The above expressions can be substituted into the asymptotic gain model equation to find the overall gain G. The resulting gain is the current gain of the amplifier with a short-circuit load.

===== Gain using alternative output variables =====
In the amplifier of Figure 6, R_{L} and R_{C2} are in parallel. To obtain the transresistance gain, say A_{ρ}, that is, the gain using voltage as output variable, the short-circuit current gain G is multiplied by R_{C2} // R_{L} in accordance with Ohm's law:

$$A_{ \rho} = G \left( R_\mathrm{C2} // R_\mathrm{L} \right) \ .$$

The open-circuit voltage gain is found from A_{ρ} by setting R_{L} → ∞.

To obtain the current gain when load current i_{L} in load resistor R_{L} is the output variable, say A_{i}, the formula for current division is used: i_{L} = i_{out} × R_{C2} / ( R_{C2} + R_{L} ) and the short-circuit current gain G is multiplied by this loading factor:

$$A_i = G \left( \frac {R_{C2}} {R_{C2}+ R_{L}} \right) \ .$$

Of course, the short-circuit current gain is recovered by setting R_{L} = 0 Ω.

== See also ==
- Blackman's theorem
- Extra element theorem
- Mason's gain formula
- Feedback amplifiers
- Return ratio
- Signal-flow graph
