= R. D. Middlebrook =

Robert David Middlebrook (May 16, 1929 – April 16, 2010) was a professor of electrical engineering at the California Institute of Technology (Caltech). He is most well known in the field of power electronics and as a proponent of design-oriented circuit analysis.

== Biography ==
He was born in England in 1929. He died in California on April 16, 2010.

== Power electronics ==
He is regarded as one of the founders of the field of power electronics. He developed the state-space averaging method of analysis and other tools crucial to modern power electronics design.

He was highly regarded both as a researcher and a teacher. He founded the Power Electronics Group at Caltech. Many of his former students are leaders in the field of power electronics today, including Slobodan Ćuk, Vatche Vorperian, Dragan Maksimovic, Robert Erickson, Khai Ngo and V. Ramanarayanan.

The IEEE Power Electronics Society has established the R. David Middlebrook award for "outstanding contribution in the technical field of power electronics" in his honor. Middlebrook was one of the founders of the IEEE Applied Power Electronics Conference (APEC).

== Design-oriented analysis ==
Dr. Middlebrook was a leading proponent of Design-Oriented Analysis (D-OA) of electrical circuits, which is a circuit analysis technique that seeks to develop circuit equations that are simple yet physically insightful. He developed many of the tools of D-OA including the Extra element theorem and the General Feedback Theorem. His goal with D-OA was to fundamentally change the way electrical engineering is taught in order to focus on practical design rather than circuit analysis. Middlebrook advocated keeping circuit analysis and equations as simple as possible, only adding additional complexity when experiments show it to be necessary. Many engineers who have studied D-OA after a traditional electrical engineering education have asked why circuit analysis is not taught in school using Middlebrook's methods. A catchphrase familiar to Middlebrook's Caltech students is his dogged assertion of "salient points" in the application of his D-OA methodology during instruction or in redline on graded (homework) assignments or tests.

He wrote several books, including An Introduction to Junction Transistor Theory, which helped early electrical engineers devise practical applications for the transistor.

== Awards and recognition ==
Middlebrook was a Life Fellow of the IEEE and a Fellow of the IEE (UK). His technical recognitions include:

- Richard P. Feynman Prize for Excellence in Teaching, 1997; Caltech's highest teaching award.
- Edward Longstreth Medal of the Franklin Institute “for the development of switched-mode power converters.” Given at the Franklin Institute in Philadelphia on May 1, 1991.
- Power Conversion International Magazine (PCIM) Award for Leadership in Power Electronics Education, given at the High Frequency Power Conversion Conference in Santa Clara in May 1990.
- IEEE Millennium Medal, 2000, “in recognition and appreciation of valuable services and outstanding contributions.”
- IEEE Centennial Medal, 1984, “for extraordinary achievement deserving of special recognition.”
- William E. Newell Power Electronics Award for Outstanding Achievement in Power Electronics, presented at the June 1982 IEEE Power Electronics Specialists Conference in Boston.
- Award for Excellence in Teaching, presented by the Board of Directors of the Associated Students of the California Institute of Technology (Caltech) in June 1982.
- I*R 100 Award from Industrial Research Magazine “for one of the 100 Most Significant New Technical Products of the Year” in 1980.
