= Harold Stephen Black =

American electrical engineer

- Born: April 14, 1898; Leominster, Massachusetts
- Died: December 11, 1983 (aged 85); Summit, New Jersey
- Education: Worcester Polytechnic Institute
- Known for: negative feedback
- Scientific career
- Fields: Electrical engineer

Harold Stephen Black (April 14, 1898 – December 11, 1983) was an American electrical engineer, who revolutionized the field of applied electronics by inventing the negative feedback amplifier in 1927. To some, his invention is considered the most important breakthrough of the twentieth century in the field of electronics, since it has a wide area of application. This is because all electronic devices (vacuum tubes, bipolar transistors and MOS transistors) are inherently nonlinear, but they can be made substantially linear with the application of negative feedback. Negative feedback works by sacrificing gain for higher linearity (or in other words, smaller distortion/intermodulation). By sacrificing gain, it also has an additional effect of increasing the bandwidth of the amplifier. However, a negative feedback amplifier can be unstable such that it may oscillate. Once the stability problem is solved, the negative feedback amplifier is extremely useful in the field of electronics. Black published a famous paper, Stabilized feedback amplifiers, in 1934.

== Biography ==
He was born in Leominster, Massachusetts in 1898. He went to Worcester Polytechnic Institute (WPI) for his first degree. Subsequently, he received a B.S.S. in Electrical Engineering from WPI in 1921 and then joined Western Electric, which was the manufacturing arm of AT&T. He joined Bell Labs (1925), where he was a member of technical staff until his retirement (1963).

Black started writing his autobiography with the tentative title "Before the ferry docked". However, he died in December 1983 at age 85 before he could finish it.

== Work ==
Black's work on amplifier design came from a practical Bell System problem: long-distance carrier telephony. Carrier systems put several voice channels on the same line, and each repeater had to amplify all of them without creating unwanted signals in other channels. A long route might use many repeaters in series, so small errors in gain, linearity, or frequency response could build up over the length of the circuit.

His first approach was the feedforward amplifier. It compared an amplifier's input and output, separated out the unwanted distortion, and added a correcting signal to cancel part of it. The circuit showed that large reductions in distortion were possible, but it required very accurate balance and was difficult to keep adjusted in telephone service.

In 1927, Black invented the negative feedback amplifier. Instead of trying to make the vacuum tube itself perfectly linear, the circuit used an amplifier with more gain than was needed and fed part of the output back to the input in opposite phase. The excess gain was sacrificed to make the amplifier more stable, more linear, and better matched to the line. Black later wrote that the idea came to him while commuting by ferry across the Hudson River from New Jersey to New York City, and that he sketched the circuit and equations on a page of The New York Times.

The first major application was not a general-purpose audio amplifier, but a carrier telephone repeater. In the Morristown, New Jersey, field trials, Western Electric tested long chains of feedback amplifiers for a broadband cable carrier system. The trial showed that many low-distortion repeaters could be operated in tandem over a simulated transcontinental distance.

The importance of the invention was later emphasized by Mervin J. Kelly of Bell Laboratories when Black received the 1957 Lamme Medal. Kelly described the negative-feedback amplifier as "one of the two inventions" of widest importance in electronics and communications during the preceding half-century, and connected it directly with long-distance telephone, television, and transoceanic cable systems.

Black published "Stabilized Feedback Amplifiers" in 1934.Because a feedback amplifier can oscillate if poorly designed, practical use of the circuit depended on stability theory, including the work of Harry Nyquist and later design methods developed by Hendrik Wade Bode. Black's 1934 paper was later reprinted by the Proceedings of the IEEE.

Black also worked on pulse-code modulation and wrote Modulation Theory, published by Van Nostrand in 1953. He held many patents, including U.S. Patent 2,102,671, "Wave Translation System", covering the negative feedback amplifier.

== Awards ==
- National Inventors Hall of Fame inductee number 25, 1981
- Robert H. Goddard Award from WPI 1981
- AIEE Lamme Medal 1958
- D. Eng. degree (honorary) from WPI 1955
- Research Corporation Scientific Award 1952
- John H. Potts Memorial Award of the Audio Engineering Society
- John Price Wetherill Medal of the Franklin Institute
- Certificate of Appreciation from the US War Department.
- WPI gives away the annual Harold S. Black Scholarship (1992-)
