= Insulin oscillation =

Variation of insulin concentration in blood

Insulin release from pancreas is pulsatile with a period of 3-6 minutes.

The insulin concentration in blood increases after meals and gradually returns to basal levels during the next 1–2 hours. However, the basal insulin level is not stable. It oscillates with a regular period of 3-6 min. After a meal the amplitude of these oscillations increases but the periodicity remains constant. The oscillations are believed to be important for insulin sensitivity by preventing downregulation of insulin receptors in target cells. Such downregulation underlies insulin resistance, which is common in type 2 diabetes. It would therefore be advantageous to administer insulin to diabetic patients in a manner mimicking the natural oscillations. The insulin oscillations are generated by pulsatile release of the hormone from the pancreas. Insulin originates from beta cells located in the islets of Langerhans. Since each islet contains up to 2000 beta cells and there are one million islets in the pancreas it is apparent that pulsatile secretion requires sophisticated synchronization both within and among the islets of Langerhans.

Pulsatile insulin release from single beta cells is synchronized in each islet of Langerhans as well as among all islets in the pancreas.

== Mechanism ==
Pulsatile insulin secretion from individual beta cells is driven by oscillation of the calcium concentration in the cells. In beta cells lacking contact, the periodicity of these oscillations is rather variable (2-10 min). However, within an islet of Langerhans the oscillations become synchronized by electrical coupling between closely located beta cells that are connected by gap junctions, and the periodicity is more uniform (3-6 min).

Coordination of pulsatile insulin release. In addition to gap junctions, coordination is done by ATP signaling.

Pulsatile insulin release from the entire pancreas requires that secretion is synchronized between 1 million islets within a 25 cm long organ. Much like the cardiac pacemaker, the pancreas is connected to cranial nerve 10, and others, but the oscillations are accomplished by intrapancreatic neurons and do not require neural input from the brain. It is not entirely clear which neural factors account for this synchronization but ATP as well as the gasses NO and CO may be involved. The effect of these neural factors is to induce sudden dramatic elevation of calcium in the cytoplasm by releasing calcium from the endoplasmic reticulum (ER) of the beta cells. This elevation results in release of ATP from the beta cells. The released ATP in turn binds to receptors on neighbouring beta cells leading to a regenerative wave of rapid calcium elevation among the cells within the islet. This signal is believed to entrain pulsatile insulin release from the islets into a common pancreatic rhythm.

== Clinical significance ==
The insulin oscillations are particularly pronounced in the portal vein delivering blood from the pancreas to the liver, which is a major insulin target. Disturbances of the insulin oscillations occur early in type 2 diabetes and may contribute to insulin resistance. Pulsatile insulin delivery to the portal vein or islet cell transplantation to the liver of diabetic patients are therefore attractive therapeutic alternatives.

== See also ==
- Insulin
- Diabetes
