= Current divider =

Simple linear circuit

Figure 1: Schematic of an electrical circuit illustrating current division. Notation R_{T} refers to the total resistance of the circuit to the right of resistor R_{X}.

In electronics, a current divider is a simple linear circuit that produces an output current (I_{X}) that is a fraction of its input current (I_{T}). Current division refers to the splitting of current between the branches of the divider. The currents in the various branches of such a circuit will always divide in such a way as to minimize the total energy expended.

The formula describing a current divider is similar in form to that for the voltage divider. However, the ratio describing current division places the impedance of the considered branches in the denominator, unlike voltage division, where the considered impedance is in the numerator. This is because in current dividers, total energy expended is minimized, resulting in currents that go through paths of least impedance, hence the inverse relationship with impedance. Comparatively, voltage divider is used to satisfy Kirchhoff's voltage law (KVL). The voltage around a loop must sum up to zero, so the voltage drops must be divided evenly in a direct relationship with the impedance.

To be specific, if two or more impedances are in parallel, the current that enters the combination will be split between them in inverse proportion to their impedances (according to Ohm's law). It also follows that if the impedances have the same value, the current is split equally.

== Current divider ==
A general formula for the current I_{X} in a resistor R_{X} that is in parallel with a combination of other resistors of total resistance R_{T} (see Figure 1) is

$$I_X = \frac{R_T}{R_X + R_T} I_T,$$

where I_{T} is the total current entering the combined network of R_{X} in parallel with R_{T}. Notice that when R_{T} is composed of a parallel combination of resistors, say R_{1}, R_{2}, ... etc., then the reciprocal of each resistor must be added to find the reciprocal of the total resistance R_{T}:

$$\frac{1}{R_T} = \frac{1}{R_1} + \frac{1}{R_2} + \ldots + \frac{1}{R_n}.$$

== General case ==
Although the resistive divider is most common, the current divider may be made of frequency-dependent impedances. In the general case:

$$\frac{1}{Z_T} = \frac{1}{Z_1} + \frac{1}{Z_2} + \ldots + \frac{1}{Z_n},$$

and the current I_{X} is given by

$$I_X = \frac{Z_T}{Z_X} I_T$$

where Z_{T} refers to the equivalent impedance of the entire circuit.

== Using admittance ==
Instead of using impedances, the current divider rule can be applied just like the voltage divider rule if admittance (the inverse of impedance) is used:

$$I_X = \frac{Y_X}{Y_T} I_T.$$

Take care to note that Y_{T} is a straightforward addition, not the sum of the inverses inverted (as would be done for a standard parallel resistive network). For Figure 1, the current I_{X} would be

$$I_X = \frac{Y_X}{Y_T} I_T = \frac{\frac{1}{R_X}}{\frac{1}{R_X} + \frac{1}{R_1} + \frac{1}{R_2} + \frac{1}{R_3}} I_T.$$

=== Example: RC combination ===
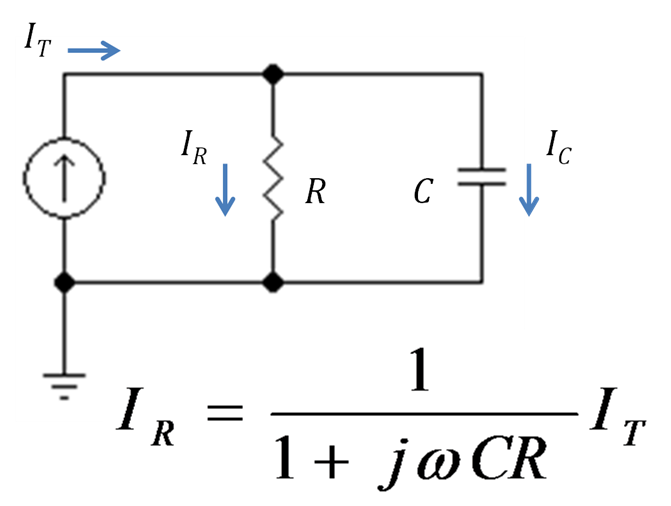
Figure 2: A low-pass RC current divider

Figure 2 shows a simple current divider made up of a capacitor and a resistor. Using the formula below, the current in the resistor is

$$I_R = \frac{\frac{1}{j \omega C}}{R + \frac{1}{j \omega C}} I_T = \frac{1}{1 + j \omega CR} I_T,$$

where Z_{C} = 1/(jωC) is the impedance of the capacitor, and j is the imaginary unit.

The product τ = CR is known as the time constant of the circuit, and the frequency for which ωCR = 1 is called the corner frequency of the circuit. Because the capacitor has zero impedance at high frequencies and infinite impedance at low frequencies, the current in the resistor remains at its DC value I_{T} for frequencies up to the corner frequency, whereupon it drops toward zero for higher frequencies as the capacitor effectively short-circuits the resistor. In other words, the current divider is a low-pass filter for current in the resistor.

== Loading effect ==
Figure 3: A current amplifier (gray box) driven by a Norton source (i_{S}, R_{S}) and with a resistor load R_{L}. Current divider in blue box at input (R_{S}, R_{in}) reduces the current gain, as does the current divider in green box at the output (R_{out},R_{L})

The gain of an amplifier generally depends on its source and load terminations. Current amplifiers and transconductance amplifiers are characterized by a short-circuit output condition, and current amplifiers and transresistance amplifiers are characterized using ideal infinite-impedance current sources. When an amplifier is terminated by a finite, non-zero termination, and/or driven by a non-ideal source, the effective gain is reduced due to the loading effect at the output and/or the input, which can be understood in terms of current division.

Figure 3 shows a current amplifier example. The amplifier (gray box) has input resistance R_{in}, output resistance R_{out} and an ideal current gain A_{i}. With an ideal current driver (infinite Norton resistance) all the source current i_{S} becomes input current to the amplifier. However, for a Norton driver a current divider is formed at the input that reduces the input current to

$$i_i = \frac{R_S}{R_S + R_\text{in}} i_S,$$

which clearly is less than i_{S}. Likewise, for a short circuit at the output, the amplifier delivers an output current i_{out} = A_{in}i_{i} to the short circuit. However, when the load is a non-zero resistor R_{L}, the current delivered to the load is reduced by current division to the value

$$i_L = \frac{R_\text{out}}{R_\text{out} + R_L} A_i i_i.$$

Combining these results, the ideal current gain A_{i} realized with an ideal driver and a short-circuit load is reduced to the loaded gain A_{loaded}:

$$A_\text{loaded} =\frac{i_L}{i_S} = \frac{R_S}{R_S + R_\text{in}} \frac{R_\text{out}}{R_\text{out} + R_L} A_i.$$

The resistor ratios in the above expression are called the loading factors. For more discussion of loading in other amplifier types, see Voltage division § Loading effect.

=== Unilateral versus bilateral amplifiers ===
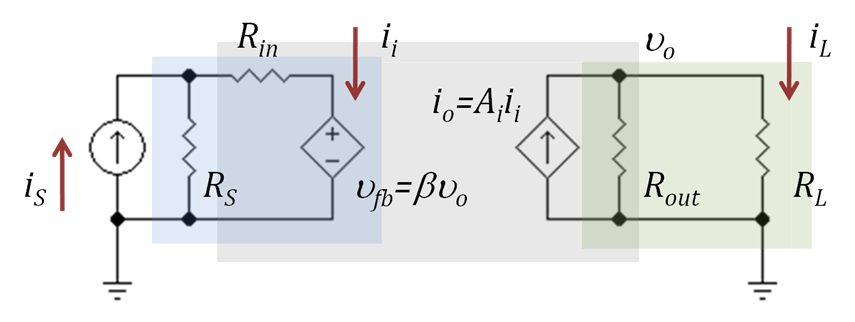
Figure 4: Current amplifier as a bilateral two-port network; feedback through dependent voltage source of gain β V/V

Figure 3 and the associated discussion refers to a unilateral amplifier. In a more general case where the amplifier is represented by a two-port network, the input resistance of the amplifier depends on its load, and the output resistance on the source impedance. The loading factors in these cases must employ the true amplifier impedances including these bilateral effects. For example, taking the unilateral current amplifier of Figure 3, the corresponding bilateral two-port network is shown in Figure 4 based upon h-parameters. Carrying out the analysis for this circuit, the current gain with feedback A_{fb} is found to be

$$A_\text{fb} = \frac{i_L}{i_S} = \frac{A_\text{loaded}}{1 + \beta(R_L/R_S) A_\text{loaded}}.$$

That is, the ideal current gain A_{i} is reduced not only by the loading factors, but due to the bilateral nature of the two-port by an additional factor (1 + β(R_{L}/R_{S}) A_{loaded}), which is typical for negative-feedback amplifier circuits. The factor β(R_{L}/R_{S}) is the current feedback provided by the voltage feedback source of voltage gain β V/V. For instance, for an ideal current source with R_{S} = ∞ Ω, the voltage feedback has no influence, and for R_{L} = 0 Ω, there is zero load voltage, again disabling the feedback.

== See also ==
- Voltage divider
- Resistor
- Ohm's law
- Thévenin's theorem
- Voltage regulation
