= Robert Weingard =

American philosopher (1942–1996)

Robert Weingard (1942 – September 14, 1996) was an American philosopher. He was a philosopher of science and professor of philosophy at Rutgers University.

== Biography ==
Born 1942, in New York City, Weingard became faculty member at Rutgers University and later joined the Department of Philosophy of Rutger University's School of Arts and Sciences in 1988. Weingard died on September 14, 1996, aged 53 or 54, of a heart attack. Some of his articles were published posthumously.

Weingard supervised the PhD thesis Explaining Time's Arrow (1997) of Craig Callender, now professor of philosophy at the University of California, San Diego. He also supervised the PhD thesis of Nick Huggett, now an LAS Distinguished Professor of Philosophy at University of Illinois, Chicago (1995).

Weingard worked on the philosophy of physics and the philosophy of space and time. His interest included in particular the foundations of quantum mechanics, the de Broglie–Bohm theory and quantum field theory and relations to quantum cosmology.

== Publications ==
- Robert Weingard: A philosopher looks at string theory. In: Craig Callender, Nick Huggett (eds.): Physics meets philosophy at the Planck scale: contemporary theories in quantum gravity, Cambridge University Press, 2001, ISBN 0-521-66280-X / ISBN 0-521-66445-4, pp. 138–151
- Craig Callender, Robert Weingard: Topology change and the unity of space, Studies in History and Philosophy of Modern Physics, vol. 31, no. 2, pp. 227–246, 2000, full text
- Nick Huggett, Robert Weingard: Gauge fields, gravity and Bohm's theory. In: Tian Yu Cao (ed.): Conceptual Foundations of Quantum Field Theory, Cambridge University Press, 1999, p. 287
- Craig Callender, Robert Weingard: Nonlocality in the expanding infinite well, Foundations of Physics Letters, vol. 11, no. 5, pp. 495–498, 1998, full text
- Robert Weingard, Craig Callender: Trouble in paradise: Problems for Bohm's theory, The Monist, Quantum Mechanics and the Real World, vol. 80, no. 1 January 1997, abstract (in French language)
- H. R. Brown, A. Elby, R. Weingard: Cause and effect in the pilot-wave interpretation of quantum mechanics, in "Bohmian Mechanics and Quantum Theory: An Appraisal", eds. J.T. Cushing, A. Fine and S. Goldstein, Kluwer Academic Publishers, Dordrecht, 1996, pp. 309–319
- Craig Callender, Robert Weingard: Time, Bohm's theory, and quantum cosmology, Philosophy of Science, vol. 63, September 1996, pp. 470–474, abstract
- Nick Huggett, Robert Weingard: Critical Review: Paul Teller's interpretive introduction to quantum field theory, Philosophy of Science, vol. 63, June 1996, pp. 302–314, abstract
- Craig Callender, Robert Weingard: Bohmian cosmology and the quantum smearing of the initial singularity (communicated by Peter R. Holland), Physics Letters A, Volume 208, Issues 1–2, 20 November 1995, pp. 59–61, abstract
- Nick Huggett, Robert Weingard: Interpretations of quantum field theory, Philosophy of Science, 61, 1994, pp. 370–388, abstract
- Craig Callender, Robert Weingard: The Bohmian model of quantum cosmology, Philosophy of Science Association, PSA 1994, Vol. 1, pp. 218–227, abstract
- Nick Huggett, Robert Weingard: On the field aspect of quantum fields, Erkenntnis, vol. 40, no. 3, pp. 293–301, 1994, doi:10.1007/BF01128900, abstract
- Robert Weingard, Gerrit Smith: Critical notice: Michael Friedman's Foundations of space-time theories, Philosophy of Science, vol. 53, 1986, pp. 286–299, abstract
- Robert Weingard: Grand unified gauge theories and the number of elementary particles, Philosophy of Science, vol. 51, 1984, pp. 150–155, abstract
- Robert Weingard, Gerrit Smith: Spin and space, Synthese, vol. 50, pp. 213–231, 1982, abstract
- Robert Weingard: Some philosophical aspects of black holes, Synthese, Volume 42, Number 1, 191–219, 1979, doi:10.1007/BF00413713 abstract
- Robert Weingard: Discussion: General relativity and the conceivability of time travel, Philosophy of Science, vol. 46, 1979, pp. 328–332, abstract
- Robert Weingard: Relativity and the spatiality of mental events, Philosophical Studies, vol. 31, no. 4, 1977, pp. 279–284, doi:10.1007/BF01855233, abstract
- Robert Weingard: On the unity of space, Philosophical Studies, vol. 29, no. 3, 1976, pp. 215–220, doi:10.1007/BF00373159, abstract
- Robert Weingard: On the Ontological Status of the Metric in General Relativity, Journal of Philosophy, vol. 72, August 1975, pp. 426–431.
- Robert Weingard: On Travelling Backward in Time, Synthese, vol. 24 (Issue entitled Space, Time and Geometry), 1972, pp. 115–132, doi:10.1007/BF00540145, abstract
