= Eric R. Bittner =

American academic

Eric R. Bittner FRSC
- Born: 23 September 1965 (age 60); Fort Wayne Indiana
- Citizenship: US
- Education: Valparaiso University; University of Chicago
- Known for: Quantum dynamics, chemical physics
- Awards: Guggenheim Fellow, Fulbright Scholar, Leverhulme Professor, Ulam Scholar
- Scientific career
- Fields: Theoretical Chemistry and Physics
- Doctoral advisor: John C. Light
- Other academic advisors: Peter Rossky, Hans C. Andersen

Eric R. Bittner FRSC is a theoretical chemist, physicist, and distinguished professor of chemical physics at the University of Houston.

== Biography ==
Bittner obtained his B.S. in chemistry and in physics from Valparaiso University in 1988. From 1988 to 1994 he worked with John C. Light at the University of Chicago and obtained his Ph.D. thesis in 1994 on Quantum Theories of Energy Exchange at the Gas-Surface Interface. Subsequently, he worked at the University of Texas at Austin until 1996 as postdoctoral fellow of the National Science Foundation, with Peter J. Rossky as his mentor. He was visiting scholar at Stanford University from 1995 to 1997, with Hans C. Andersen as his mentor.

In 1997 he joined the University of Houston as an assistant professor of theoretical chemistry, where he became an associate professor of theoretical chemistry in 2003. In the summer of 2001, he worked as visiting faculty at the Center for Non-Linear Studies at Los Alamos National Lab and in 2023 he served as the Ulam Distinguished Scholar in the CNLS. He is currently a professor in the UH Physics Department.

In 2009 Bittner became the John and Rebecca Moores Distinguished Professor of chemical physics at the University of Houston. In 2013, he became the Hugh Roy and Lillian Cranz Cullen Professor of Physics.

He has worked at the University of Cambridge, the École Normale Supérieure, Paris, and at Los Alamos National Lab and has collaborated, among others, with Robert E. Wyatt.

Eric Bittner is also an Eagle Scout.

== Work ==
His main research interests lie with the dynamics of molecules in their excited electronic states.

Bittner and his co-workers have investigated organic semiconductors, in particular, semiconductive polymers, the modulation and tuning of their electronic dynamics due to intramolecular vibrational motions of the polymers, and investigations into phonon modes. They have worked on energy transfer in DNA molecules using methods of molecular dynamics, time-dependent density functional theory (TD-DFT) and analytical lattice models. They have developed a quantum hydrodynamics approach for computing the energies involved in quantum vibrations in small atomic clusters by combining the De Broglie–Bohm formulation of quantum mechanics and Bayesian sampling, using this approach also to study quantum aspects of the thermodynamics of small rare gas clusters in thermal regions close to the clusters' melting point. Furthermore, they used supersymmetry (SUSY) quantum mechanics for computing excitation energies of quantum systems using Monte Carlo calculations.

His APS Fellowship citation reads: “For developing theoretical and computational descriptions of quantum dynamics in molecular systems, especially for their use in understanding the migration of energy and charge in molecular electronic excited states.”

== Awards ==
Bittner has received several grants and awards for his work:

- 2023 Ulam Distinguished Scholar, Center for Nonlinear Studies, Los Alamo National Lab.
- 2022 Fellow of the American Association for the Advancement of Science.
- 2019 Distinguished Alumni Award from Valparaiso University
- 2018 Leverhulme Trust Visiting professor, Durham University
- 2016 Fellow of the American Physical Society, Division of Chemical Physics
- 2016 Fellow of the Royal Society of Chemistry
- 2012 Fulbright Canada Scholar
- 2009 John and Rebecca Moores Professorship.
- 2008 University of Houston Research Excellence Award
- 2007 to 2008 Guggenheim Fellow
- 2003 Wiley/International Journal of Quantum Chemistry Young Investigator Award
- 1999 NSF CAREER Award
- 1995 to 1997 NSF Postdoctoral Fellow
- 1994 Elizabeth R. Norton Prize for Excellence in Research in Chemistry (University of Chicago)
- 1988 Lumina Award (Valparaiso University)

The John and Rebecca Moores professorship was awarded to him as recognition for "outstanding work in both research and teaching". In his nomination, special emphasis was placed on his seminal work on trajectory-base methods for performing quantum mechanical calculations.

== Publications ==
Books

- Eric R. Bittner: Quantum Dynamics: Application in Biological and Materials Systems, CRC Press, 2009, ISBN 978-1-4200-8053-7

Articles

As of November 2019, Eric R. Bittner has published over 100 scientific papers. His publications on trajectory-based methods include:

- Eric R. Bittner, Donald J. Kouri, Sean Derrickson, and Jeremy B. Maddox: Variational Quantum Hydrodynamics, in: Xavier Oriols and Jordi Mompart (eds.), Applied Bohmian Dynamics (invited review chapter), 2010,
- Eric R. Bittner: Quantum initial value representations using approximate Bohmian trajectories, Journal of Chemical Physics, vol. 119, no. 3, 2003, doi:10.1063/1.1580471 arXiv: quant-ph/0304012
- Eric R. Bittner, Donald J. Kouri: Quantum dynamics and super-symmetric quantum mechanics, in P. K. Chattaraj (ed.): Quantum Trajectories, CRC Press, 2010,
- Jeremy B. Maddox, Eric R. Bittner Estimating Bohm’s quantum force using Bayesian statistics , Journal of Chemical Physics 119, pp. 6465, 2003, doi:10.1063/1.1604772,
- Robert E. Wyatt, Eric R. Bittner: Quantum wave packet dynamics with trajectories: Implementation with adaptive Lagrangian grids of the amplitude of the wave function, Journal of Chamical Physics, vol. 113, no. 20, 22 November 2000,
- Andrey Preverzev and Eric R. Bittner: Hamiltonian Approach for Wavepacket Dynamics: Beyond Gaussian Wavepackets, Physics Letters A, vol. 373, pp. 2215–2218, 2009,
