= Robert E. Wyatt =

Professor of chemistry

Robert Eugene Wyatt is an emeritus Professor of Chemistry at the University of Texas at Austin, Department of Chemistry and Biochemistry.

== Work ==
Wyatt's work is focussed on theoretical chemistry, including the quantum theory of chemical reactions and the theory of intramolecular energy transfer. His research has covered, among others, the trajectory method of Bohmian mechanics, based on work by Louis de Broglie, Erwin Madelung and David Bohm. The method, found to be computationally more efficient than methods that are based on a direct solution of the time-dependent Schrödinger equation, has found wide acceptance by theoretical chemists.

In 2005 Wyatt published his book Quantum dynamics with trajectories with contributions by Corey J. Trahan.

Wyatt holds a W. T. Doherty professorship in chemistry at the Austin University of Texas. An October 2007 edition of the Journal of Physical Chemistry A is a Festschrift dedicated to the work of Robert E. Wyatt and his group. Wyatt has been referred to as "the world's leading expert in quantum dynamics and theoretical chemistry".

He was elected a Fellow of the American Physical Society in 1989 "for fundamental contributions to the theoretical chemical dynamics, particularly quantum mechanical reactive scattering and laser-molecule energy transfer"

== Publications ==
- Wyatt, Robert Eugene; Corey J. Trahan (2005). Quantum dynamics with trajectories. Springer. ISBN 978-0-387-22964-5.
- Robert E. Wyatt, Eric R. Bittner: Quantum wave packet dynamics with trajectories: Implementation with adaptive Lagrangian grids of the amplitude of the wave function, Journal of Chemical Physics, vol. 113, no. 20, 22 November 2000,
- Journal of Physical Chemistry A, 2007, 111 (41), pp 10171–10433, doi:10.1021/jp0795513
