= Michael D. Towler =

British theoretical physicist

Michael D. Towler (also referred to as Mike Towler, complete name Michael David Towler) is a theoretical physicist associated with the Cavendish Laboratory of the University of Cambridge and formerly research associate at University College, London and College Lecturer at Emmanuel College, Cambridge. He created and owns the Towler Institute in Vallico di Sotto in Tuscany, Italy.

== Biography ==
=== Education, career and personal life ===
Towler obtained an undergraduate degree from Bristol University in 1991, as well as his Ph.D. in 1994.

From 1994 to 1996, he was research fellow at the University of Torino, Italy. From 1997 onwards, he has been closely associated with the Theory of Condensed Matter group (TCM) of Cambridge University's Cavendish Laboratory. Initially, until 2000, he was postdoctoral research associate, subsequently held a Lloyd's Fellowship, and from 2002 to 2010 he was Royal Society research fellow of the Cavendish Laboratory. Additionally, from 2002 to 2012 he was a College Lecturer at Emmanuel College, Cambridge.

In October 2010, Towler became a postdoctoral research associate at the Department of Earth Sciences, University College, London, although he retained a desk in TCM until 2015.

He is married to bronze sculptor and philosopher Samantha Keil.

=== Work ===
Towler has been working on electronic structure theory and its application to the simulation of physical systems, including quantum Monte Carlo simulations, density functional theory and methods of quantum chemistry. He has worked on foundational issues in density functional theory and in quantum mechanics, in particular concerning the de Broglie–Bohm theory and the pilot wave formulation.

Towler developed the Cavendish Laboratory's de Broglie–Bohm simulation software LOUIS and is one of the principal authors of the Cambridge quantum Monte Carlo code CASINO. Earlier, Towler had maintained a resources page for the electronic structure program for the CRYSTAL software package.

=== Towler Institute ===
In 2005, Towler opened the Towler Institute, a science institute, conference centre and events venue in a 16th-century monastery situated in the village Vallico di Sotto in Tuscany, Italy, which he owns. Since 2005, over 350 scientists have attended one or several of the 18 events held at the Towler Institute. The events include the annual conference series Quantum Monte Carlo in the Apuan Alps held annually in July since 2005 and, since August 2006, the annual Quantum Monte Carlo and the CASINO program summer schools. In 2010, together with Antony Valentini, he organized a conference on the de Broglie-Bohm theory the Apuan Alps Centre for Physics in late August 2010, hosted at the Towler Institute and attended by many leading physicists.

== Publications ==
As of August 2011, Towler is author of “almost 60 refereed publications with over 1200 citations and a H-index of 19”.
