= Craig Callender =

Philosopher

- Born: 1968 (age 57–58)
- Education: Rutgers University
- Scientific career
- Workplaces: London School of Economics, University of California, San Diego
- Thesis: Time's Arrow (1997)
- Doctoral advisor: Robert Weingard
- Doctoral students: Nick Bostrom
- Website: https://www.craigcallender.com/

Craig Callender (born 1968) is a professor of philosophy at the University of California, San Diego. His main areas of research are philosophy of science, philosophy of physics and metaphysics.

== Education and career ==
Callender obtained his PhD in 1997 from Rutgers University with a thesis entitled Time's Arrow under the supervision of Robert Weingard. From 1996-2000, he worked in the Department of Philosophy, Logic & Scientific Method at the London School of Economics. Currently, he is a professor of philosophy at the University of California, San Diego where he is also the co-director of the Institute for Practical Ethics at the University of California, San Diego. Callender serves on the Committee for Freedom and Responsibility of Science of the International Science Council.

Callender has written articles for Scientific American on the philosophy of time and participated in the World Science Festival 2013 with Tim Maudlin and Max Tegmark on the same topic.

== Selected publications ==
In reverse chronological order, unless otherwise specified.

=== Books ===
- Callender, Craig (2017). What Makes Time Special? Oxford University Press, Oxford, ISBN 978-0-19-879730-2
- Callender, Craig, ed. (2011). The Oxford handbook of philosophy of time. Oxford Handbooks in Philosophy. Oxford University Press. ISBN 978-0-19-929820-4.
- Craig Callender (ed.): Time, Reality and Experience, Cambridge University Press, August 2002, ISBN 978-0-521-52967-9
- Craig Callender, Nick Huggett (eds.): Physics meets philosophy at the Planck scale: contemporary theories in quantum gravity, Cambridge University Press, 2001, ISBN 0-521-66280-X / ISBN 0-521-66445-4
- Craig Callender, Ralph Edney: Introducing time, Totem Books, 1997, ISBN 978-1-84046-263-0

=== Articles ===
- Callender, Craig (June 2010). "Is time an illusion?". Scientific American. 302 (6): 40–47. Bibcode:2010SciAm.302f..58C. doi:10.1038/scientificamerican0610-58. PMID 20521481.
- Craig Callender, Robert Weingard: Topology change and the unity of space, Studies in History and Philosophy of Modern Physics, vol. 31, no. 2, pp. 227–246, 2000, full text
- Craig Callender, Robert Weingard: Nonlocality in the expanding infinite well, Foundations of Physics Letters, vol. 11, no. 5, pp. 495–498, 1998, full text
- Robert Weingard, Craig Callender: Trouble in paradise: Problems for Bohm's theory, The Monist, Quantum Mechanics and the Real World, vol. 80, no. 1 January 1997, abstract (in French language)
- Craig Callender, Robert Weingard: Time, Bohm's theory, and quantum cosmology, Philosophy of Science, vol. 63, September 1996, pp. 470–474, abstract
- Craig Callender, Robert Weingard: Bohmian cosmology and the quantum smearing of the initial singularity (communicated by Peter R. Holland), Physics Letters A, Volume 208, Issues 1-2, 20 November 1995, pp. 59–61, abstract
- Craig Callender, Robert Weingard: The Bohmian model of quantum cosmology, Philosophy of Science Association, PSA 1994, Vol. 1, pp. 218–227, abstract
