= Madelung equations =

Hydrodynamic formulation of the Schrödinger equations

In theoretical physics, the Madelung equations, or the equations of quantum hydrodynamics, are Erwin Madelung's alternative formulation of the Schrödinger equation for a spinless non-relativistic particle, written in terms of hydrodynamical variables, similar to the Navier–Stokes equations of fluid dynamics. The derivation of the Madelung equations is similar to the de Broglie–Bohm formulation, which represents the Schrödinger equation as a quantum Hamilton–Jacobi equation. In both cases the hydrodynamic interpretations are not equivalent to Schrödinger's equation without the addition of a quantization condition.

Recently, the extension to the relativistic case with spin was done by having the Dirac equation written with hydrodynamic variables. In the relativistic case, the Hamilton–Jacobi equation is also the guidance equation, which therefore does not have to be postulated.

== History ==
In the fall of 1926, Erwin Madelung reformulated Schrödinger's quantum equation in a more classical and visualizable form resembling hydrodynamics. His paper was one of numerous early attempts at different approaches to quantum mechanics, including those of Louis de Broglie and Earle Hesse Kennard. The most influential of these theories was ultimately de Broglie's through the 1952 work of David Bohm now called Bohmian mechanics.

In 1994 Timothy C. Wallstrom showed that an additional ad hoc quantization condition must be added to the Madelung equations to reproduce Schrödinger's work. His analysis paralleled earlier work by Takehiko Takabayashi on the hydrodynamic interpretation of Bohmian mechanics. The mathematical foundations of the Madelung equations continue to be a topic of research.

== Equations ==
The Madelung equations are the quantum mechanical counterpart of the Euler equations:

$$\begin{align}
& \frac{\partial \rho_m (\mathbf{x},t)}{\partial t} + \nabla\cdot(\rho_m (\mathbf{x},t) \mathbf{v}(\mathbf{x},t)) = 0, \\[4pt]
& \frac{D \mathbf{v}(\mathbf{x},t)}{Dt} = \frac{\partial \mathbf{v} (\mathbf{x},t)}{\partial t} + \mathbf{v}(\mathbf{x},t) \cdot \nabla \mathbf{v}(\mathbf{x},t) = -\frac{1}{m} \nabla (Q(\mathbf{x},t) + V(\mathbf{x},t)),
\end{align}$$

where

- $\mathbf{x}$ is the position vector,
- $\mathbf{v}(\mathbf{x},t)$ is the flow velocity, defined in terms of the phase of the Schrödinger wave function $\psi(\mathbf{x},t)$ below,
- $\rho_m (\mathbf{x},t) = m \rho (\mathbf{x},t) = m |\psi (\mathbf{x},t) |^2$ is the mass density,
- $Q = -\frac{\hbar^2}{2m} \frac{\nabla^2 \sqrt{\rho (\mathbf{x},t)}}{\sqrt{\rho (\mathbf{x},t)}} = -\frac{\hbar^2}{2m} \frac{\nabla^2 \sqrt{\rho_m (\mathbf{x},t)}}{\sqrt{\rho_m (\mathbf{x},t)}}$ is the Bohm quantum potential, and
- $V(\mathbf{x},t)$ is the potential from the Schrödinger equation.

The Madelung equations answer the question of whether $\mathbf{v}(\mathbf{x},t)$ obeys the continuity equations of hydrodynamics, and, if so, what plays the role of the stress tensor.

The circulation of the flow velocity field along any closed path obeys the auxiliary quantization condition $\Gamma \doteq \oint{m\mathbf{v} \cdot d\mathbf{l}} = 2\pi n\hbar$ for all integers n.

== Derivation ==
The derivation of the Madelung equations starts with the wave function written in polar form

$$\psi(\mathbf{x}, t) = R(\mathbf{x}, t) e^{ i S(\mathbf{x}, t)/\hbar},$$

where $R(\mathbf{x},t)$, the amplitude, and $S(\mathbf{x},t)$, the action function, are both real-valued functions and

$$\rho(\mathbf{x},t)=\psi(\mathbf{x},t)^*\psi(\mathbf{x},t)=R^2(\mathbf{x},t),$$

is the associated probability density. Substituting the polar form of the wave function into the definition of the probability current gives

$$\mathbf{J} = \frac{\hbar}{2mi}(\psi^* \nabla \psi - \psi \nabla \psi^*) = \frac{1}{m}\rho(\mathbf{x},t)\nabla S(\mathbf{x},t) = \rho(\mathbf{x},t)\mathbf{v}(\mathbf{x},t),$$

where the velocity of the probability fluid is expressed as

$$\mathbf{v}(\mathbf{x},t)=\frac{1}{m}\nabla S(\mathbf{x},t).$$

The interpretation of $\mathbf{v}(\mathbf{x},t)$ as "velocity" should not be taken too literally because a simultaneous exact measurement of position and momentum (expressed as a function of $\mathbf{v}(\mathbf{x},t)$) would violate the uncertainty principle.

Next, by substituting the polar form into the Schrödinger equation

$$i\hbar\frac{\partial \psi(\mathbf{x},t)}{\partial t} = V(\mathbf{x},t) \psi(\mathbf{x}, t) - \frac{\hbar^2}{2m} \nabla^2 \psi(\mathbf{x}, t),$$

performing the appropriate differentiations, dividing the equation by $e^{ i S(\mathbf{x}, t)/\hbar}$ and separating real and imaginary parts, one obtains a system of two coupled partial differential equations (PDEs):

$$\begin{align}
&\frac{\partial R(\mathbf{x},t)}{\partial t} + \frac{1}{m}\nabla R(\mathbf{x},t)\cdot\nabla S(\mathbf{x},t) + \frac{1}{2m} R(\mathbf{x},t)\Delta S(\mathbf{x},t) = 0,\\
&\frac{\partial S(\mathbf{x},t)}{\partial t} + \frac{1}{2m}\left[\nabla S(\mathbf{x},t)\right]^2 + V(\mathbf{x},t) = \frac{\hbar^2}{2m}\frac{\Delta R(\mathbf{x},t)}{R(\mathbf{x},t)}.
\end{align}$$

The first PDE, corresponding to the imaginary part of the Schrödinger equation, can be interpreted as the continuity equation. The second PDE, corresponding to the real part of the Schrödinger equation, is also referred to as the quantum Hamilton-Jacobi equation. Multiplying the continuity equation by $2R$ and calculating the gradient of the quantum Hamilton-Jacobi equation results in the Madelung equations

$$\begin{align}
&\frac{\partial \rho(\mathbf{x},t)}{\partial t} + \nabla\cdot\left[  \rho(\mathbf{x},t)v(\mathbf{x},t) \right]= 0,\\
&\frac{D\mathbf{v}(\mathbf{x},t)}{Dt} = \frac{\partial \mathbf{v}(\mathbf{x},t)}{\partial t} + \left[\mathbf{v}(\mathbf{x},t) \cdot \nabla \right] \mathbf{v}(\mathbf{x},t) = -\frac{1}{m}\nabla \left[V(\mathbf{x},t) - \frac{\hbar^2}{2m}\frac{\Delta \sqrt{\rho(\mathbf{x},t)}}{\sqrt{\rho(\mathbf{x},t)}}\right] =-\frac{1}{m}\nabla \left[V(\mathbf{x},t) + Q(\mathbf{x},t)\right],
\end{align}$$

with quantum potential

$$Q(\mathbf{x},t) = - \frac{\hbar^2}{2m}\frac{\Delta \sqrt{\rho(\mathbf{x},t)}}{\sqrt{\rho(\mathbf{x},t)}}.$$

Equivalently, the quantum Hamilton-Jacobi equation can also be written in a form similar to the Cauchy momentum equation:

$$\frac{D\mathbf{v}(\mathbf{x},t)}{Dt} = \mathbf{f} (\mathbf{x},t) - \frac{1}{\rho (\mathbf{x},t)} \nabla \cdot \mathbf{p}_Q (\mathbf{x},t),$$

with an external force defined as

$$\mathbf{f}(\mathbf{x},t) = -\frac{1}{m}\nabla V(\mathbf{x},t),$$

and a quantum pressure tensor

$$\mathbf{p}_Q (\mathbf{x},t) = -\frac{\hbar^2}{4m^2} \rho_m(\mathbf{x},t) \nabla \otimes \nabla \ln \rho_m (\mathbf{x},t).$$

The integral energy stored in the quantum pressure tensor is proportional to the Fisher information, which accounts for the quality of measurements. Thus, according to the Cramér–Rao bound, the uncertainty principle is equivalent to a standard inequality for the efficiency of measurements.

=== Quantum energies ===
The thermodynamic definition of the quantum chemical potential

$$\mu (\mathbf{x},t) = Q (\mathbf{x},t) + V (\mathbf{x},t) = \frac{\widehat H \sqrt{\rho_m (\mathbf{x},t)}}{\sqrt{\rho_m (\mathbf{x},t)}}$$

follows from the hydrostatic force balance above:

$$\nabla \mu (\mathbf{x},t) = \frac{m \nabla \cdot \mathbf p_Q (\mathbf{x},t)}{\rho_m(\mathbf{x},t)} + \nabla V (\mathbf{x},t).$$

According to thermodynamics, at equilibrium the chemical potential is constant everywhere, which corresponds straightforwardly to the stationary Schrödinger equation. Therefore, the eigenvalues of the Schrödinger equation are free energies, which differ from the internal energies of the system. The particle internal energy is calculated as

$$\varepsilon (\mathbf{x},t) = \mu (\mathbf{x},t) - \operatorname{tr}(\mathbf p_Q (\mathbf{x},t)) \frac{m}{\rho_m (\mathbf{x},t)} = -\frac{\hbar^2}{8m} (\nabla \ln \rho_m (\mathbf{x},t))^2 + U (\mathbf{x},t),$$

and is related to the von Weizsäcker correction of density functional theory.

== See also ==
- Classical limit
- De Broglie–Bohm theory
- Magnetohydrodynamics
- Pilot wave theory
- Quantum potential
- Quantum hydrodynamics
- WKB approximation
