= Nick Huggett =

British-American philosopher

- Born: 1966 (age 59–60)

Education
- Education: Rutgers University (PhD), Oxford University (BA)
- Thesis: The Philosophy of Fields and Particles in Classical and Quantum Mechanics, including The Problem of Renormalization (1995)
- Doctoral advisor: Robert Weingard

Philosophical work
- Era: 21st-century philosophy
- Region: Western philosophy
- Institutions: University of Illinois Chicago

Nick Huggett (born 1966) is a British-American philosopher and LAS Distinguished Professor at the University of Illinois Chicago.

== Books ==
- Quantum gravity in a laboratory?, together with Niels Linnemann and Mike D. Schneider, Cambridge University Press 2023
- Everywhere and Everywhen: Adventures in Physics and Philosophy, Oxford University Press 2010
- Physics Meets Philosophy at the Planck Scale, edited with Craig Callender, Cambridge University Press 2001
- Space from Zeno to Einstein: Classic Readings with a Contemporary Commentary (ed.), MIT Press 1999
