= 2024 French legislative election in Haute-Loire =

Following the first round of the 2024 French legislative election on 30 June 2024, runoff elections in each constituency where no candidate received a vote share greater than 50 percent were scheduled for 7 July. Candidates permitted to stand in the runoff elections needed to either come in first or second place in the first round or achieve more than 12.5 percent of the votes of the entire electorate (as opposed to 12.5 percent of the vote share due to low turnout).

== Haute-Loire ==
=== 1st constituency ===
Candidate	Party or alliance		First round		Second round	
Candidate	Party or alliance		Votes	%	Votes	%
Laurent Wauquiez	The Republicans		27,013	36.80	42,828	61.61
Alexandre Heuzey	National Rally		25,091	34.18	26,684	38.39
Celline Gacon	New Popular Front	The Ecologists	13,694	18.66		
Cécile Marcelle Gallien	Ensemble	Democratic Movement	6,932	9.44		
Electre Dracos	Far-left	Lutte Ouvrière	668	0.91		
Total			73,398	100.00	69,512	100.00
Valid votes			73,398	98.04	69,512	93.94
Invalid votes			448	0.60	1,070	1.45
Blank votes			1,020	1.36	3,413	4.61
Total votes			74,866	100.00	73,995	100.00
Registered voters/turnout			102,716	72.89	102,716	72.04

=== 2nd constituency ===
Candidate	Party or alliance		First round		Second round	
Candidate	Party or alliance		Votes	%	Votes	%
Jean-Pierre Vigier	The Republicans		21,573	38.69	34,629	64.53
Suzanne Maryse Denise Fourets	National Rally		17,885	32.08	19,033	35.47
Andre Antoine Célestin Chapaveire	New Popular Front	Socialist Party	10,898	19.55		
Patricia Pierrette Gire-Joubert	Ensemble	Renaissance	4,607	8.26		
Antoine Brebion	Far-left	Lutte Ouvrière	795	1.43		
Total			55,758	100.00	53,662	100.00
Valid votes			55,758	97.70	53,662	95.43
Invalid votes			481	0.84	728	1.29
Blank votes			834	1.46	1,842	3.28
Total votes			57,073	100.00	56,232	100.00
Registered voters/turnout			79,390	71.89	79,392	70.83
