= Quantum potential =

Quantum mechanical statistic

The quantum potential or quantum potentiality is a central concept of the de Broglie–Bohm formulation of quantum mechanics, introduced by David Bohm in 1952.

Initially presented under the name quantum-mechanical potential, subsequently quantum potential, it was later elaborated upon by Bohm and Basil Hiley in its interpretation as an information potential which acts on a quantum particle. It is also referred to as quantum potential energy, Bohm potential, quantum Bohm potential or Bohm quantum potential.

Quantum potential
$\quad Q = - \frac{\hbar^2}{2m} \frac{\nabla^2 R}{R}$

In the framework of the de Broglie–Bohm theory, the quantum potential is a term within the Schrödinger equation which acts to guide the movement of quantum particles. The quantum potential approach introduced by Bohm provides a physically less fundamental exposition of the idea presented by Louis de Broglie: de Broglie had postulated in 1925 that the relativistic wave function defined on spacetime represents a pilot wave which guides a quantum particle, represented as an oscillating peak in the wave field, but he had subsequently abandoned his approach because he was unable to derive the guidance equation for the particle from a non-linear wave equation. The seminal articles of Bohm in 1952 introduced the quantum potential and included answers to the objections which had been raised against the pilot wave theory.

The Bohm quantum potential is closely linked with the results of other approaches, in particular relating to works of Erwin Madelung in 1927 and Carl Friedrich von Weizsäcker in 1935.

Building on the interpretation of the quantum theory introduced by Bohm in 1952, David Bohm and Basil Hiley in 1975 presented how the concept of a quantum potential leads to the notion of an "unbroken wholeness of the entire universe", proposing that the fundamental new quality introduced by quantum physics is nonlocality.

== Relation to the Schrödinger equation ==
The Schrödinger equation

$$i \hbar \frac{\partial \psi}{\partial t} = \left( - \frac{\hbar^2}{2m} \nabla^2 +V \right)\psi \quad$$

is re-written using the polar form for the wave function $\psi = R \exp(i S / \hbar)$ with real-valued functions $R$ and $S$, where $R$ is the amplitude (absolute value) of the wave function $\psi$, and $S/\hbar$ its phase. This yields two equations: from the imaginary and real part of the Schrödinger equation follow the continuity equation and the quantum Hamilton–Jacobi equation respectively.

=== Continuity equation ===
The imaginary part of the Schrödinger equation in polar form yields

$$\frac{\partial R}{\partial t} = -\frac{1}{2m} \left[ R \nabla^2 S  + 2 \nabla R \cdot \nabla S \right],$$

which, provided $\rho = R^2$, can be interpreted as the continuity equation $\partial \rho / \partial t + \nabla \cdot( \rho v) =0$ for the probability density $\rho$ and the velocity field $v = \frac{1}{m}\nabla S$

=== Quantum Hamilton–Jacobi equation ===
The real part of the Schrödinger equation in polar form yields a modified Hamilton–Jacobi equation

$-\frac{\partial S}{\partial t} = \frac{\|\nabla S\|^2}{2m} + V + Q$

also referred to as quantum Hamilton–Jacobi equation. It differs from the classical Hamilton–Jacobi equation only by the term

$Q = - \frac{\hbar^2}{2m} \frac{\nabla^2 R}{R}.$

This term $Q$, called quantum potential, thus depends on the curvature of the amplitude of the wave function.

In the limit $\hbar \to 0$, the function $S$ is a solution of the (classical) Hamilton–Jacobi equation; therefore, the function $S$ is also called the Hamilton–Jacobi function, or action, extended to quantum physics.

== Properties ==
Bohm trajectories under the influence of the quantum potential, at the example of an electron going through the two-slit experiment.

Hiley emphasised several aspects that regard the quantum potential of a quantum particle:

- it is derived mathematically from the real part of the Schrödinger equation under polar decomposition of the wave function, is not derived from a Hamiltonian or other external source, and could be said to be involved in a self-organising process involving a basic underlying field;
- it does not change if $R$ is multiplied by a constant, as this term is also present in the denominator, so that $Q$ is independent of the magnitude of $\psi$ and thus of field intensity; therefore, the quantum potential fulfils a precondition for nonlocality: it need not fall off as distance increases;
- it carries information about the whole experimental arrangement in which the particle finds itself.

In 1979, Hiley and his co-workers Philippidis and Dewdney presented a full calculation on the explanation of the two-slit experiment in terms of Bohmian trajectories that arise for each particle moving under the influence of the quantum potential, resulting in the well-known interference patterns.

Schematic of double-slit experiment in which Aharonov–Bohm effect can be observed: electrons pass through two slits, interfering at an observation screen, and the interference pattern undergoes a shift when a magnetic field B is turned on in the cylindrical solenoid.

Also the shift of the interference pattern which occurs in presence of a magnetic field in the Aharonov–Bohm effect could be explained as arising from the quantum potential.

=== Relation to the measurement process ===
The collapse of the wave function of the Copenhagen interpretation of quantum theory is explained in the quantum potential approach by the demonstration that, after a measurement, "all the packets of the multi-dimensional wave function that do not correspond to the actual result of measurement have no effect on the particle" from then on. Bohm and Hiley pointed out that

...the quantum potential can develop unstable bifurcation points, which separate classes of particle trajectories according to the "channels" into which they eventually enter and within which they stay. This explains how measurement is possible without "collapse" of the wave function, and how all sorts of quantum processes, such as transitions between states, fusion of two states into one and fission of one system into two, are able to take place without the need for a human observer.

Measurement then "involves a participatory transformation in which both the system under observation and the observing apparatus undergo a mutual participation so that the trajectories behave in a correlated manner, becoming correlated and separated into different, non-overlapping sets (which we call 'channels')".

=== Quantum potential of an n-particle system ===
The Schrödinger wave function of a many-particle quantum system cannot be represented in ordinary three-dimensional space. Rather, it is represented in configuration space, with three dimensions per particle. A single point in configuration space thus represents the configuration of the entire n-particle system as a whole.

A two-particle wave function $\psi(\mathbf{r_1},\mathbf{r_2},\,t)$ of identical particles of mass $m$ has the quantum potential

$$Q(\mathbf{r_1},\mathbf{r_2},\,t) = - \frac{\hbar^2}{2m} \frac{(\nabla_1^2 + \nabla_2^2) R(\mathbf{r_1},\mathbf{r_2},\,t)}{R(\mathbf{r_1},\mathbf{r_2},\,t)}$$

where $\nabla_1^2$ and $\nabla_2^2$ refer to particle 1 and particle 2 respectively. This expression generalizes in straightforward manner to $n$ particles:

$$Q(\mathbf{r_1},...,\mathbf{r_n},\,t) = -\frac{\hbar^2}{2 R(\mathbf{r_1},...,\mathbf{r_n},\,t) } \sum_{i=1}^{n} \frac{\nabla_i^2}{m_i} R(\mathbf{r_1},...,\mathbf{r_n},\,t)$$

In case the wave function of two or more particles is separable, then the system's total quantum potential becomes the sum of the quantum potentials of the two particles. Exact separability is extremely unphysical given that interactions between the system and its environment destroy the factorization; however, a wave function that is a superposition of several wave functions of approximately disjoint support will factorize approximately.

=== Derivation for a separable quantum system ===
That the wave function is separable means that $\psi$ factorizes in the form $\psi(\mathbf{r_1},\mathbf{r_2},\,t) = \psi_A(\mathbf{r_1},\,t) \psi_B(\mathbf{r_2},\,t)$. Then it follows that also $R$ factorizes, and the system's total quantum potential becomes the sum of the quantum potentials of the two particles.

$$Q(\mathbf{r_1},\mathbf{r_2},\,t) = - \frac{\hbar^2}{2m} (\frac{\nabla_1^2 R_A(\mathbf{r_1},\,t)}{R_A(\mathbf{r_1},\,t)} + \frac{\nabla_2^2 R_B(\mathbf{r_2},\,t)}{R_B(\mathbf{r_2},\,t)}) = Q_A(\mathbf{r_1},\,t) + Q_B(\mathbf{r_2},\,t)$$

In case the wave function is separable, that is, if $\psi$ factorizes in the form $\psi(\mathbf{r_1},\mathbf{r_2},\,t) = \psi_A(\mathbf{r_1},\,t) \psi_B(\mathbf{r_2},\,t)$, the two one-particle systems behave independently. More generally, the quantum potential of an $n$-particle system with separable wave function is the sum of $n$ quantum potentials, separating the system into $n$ independent one-particle systems.

== Formulation in terms of probability density ==
=== Quantum potential in terms of the probability density function ===
Bohm, as well as other physicists after him, have sought to provide evidence that the Born rule linking $R$ to the probability density function

$$\rho = R^2 \quad$$

can be understood, in a pilot wave formulation, as not representing a basic law, but rather a theorem (called quantum equilibrium hypothesis) which applies when a quantum equilibrium is reached during the course of the time development under the Schrödinger equation. With Born's rule, and straightforward application of the chain and product rules

$$\nabla^2 \sqrt \rho = \nabla \nabla \rho^{1/2} = \nabla \left(\frac{1}{2} \rho^{-1/2} \nabla \rho\right) = \frac{1}{2} \left[ \left(\nabla \rho^{-1/2}\right) \nabla \rho + \rho^{-1/2} \nabla^2 \rho \right]$$

the quantum potential, expressed in terms of the probability density function, becomes:

$$Q = - \frac{\hbar^2}{2m} \frac{\nabla^2 \sqrt{\rho}}{\sqrt{\rho}} = - \frac{\hbar^2}{4m} \left[ \frac{\nabla^2 \rho}{\rho} - \frac{1}{2} \frac{(\nabla \rho)^2}{\rho^2} \right]$$

=== Quantum force ===
The quantum force $F_Q = - \nabla Q$, expressed in terms of the probability distribution, amounts to:

$$F_Q = \frac{\hbar^2}{4m} \left[ \frac{\nabla (\nabla^2\rho)}{\rho} - \frac{ \nabla (\nabla \rho \cdot \nabla \rho) }{ 2\rho^2 } - \left( \frac{\nabla^2 \rho}{\rho} - \frac{ \nabla \rho \cdot \nabla \rho }{ \rho^2 } \right) \frac{\nabla\rho}{\rho} \right]$$

=== Formulation in configuration space and in momentum space, as the result of projections ===
M. R. Brown and B. Hiley showed that, as alternative to its formulation terms of configuration space ($x$-space), the quantum potential can also be formulated in terms of momentum space ($p$-space).

In line with David Bohm's approach, Basil Hiley and mathematician Maurice de Gosson showed that the quantum potential can be seen as a consequence of a projection of an underlying structure, more specifically of a non-commutative algebraic structure, onto a subspace such as ordinary space ($x$-space). In algebraic terms, the quantum potential can be seen as arising from the relation between implicate and explicate orders: if a non-commutative algebra is employed to describe the non-commutative structure of the quantum formalism, it turns out that it is impossible to define an underlying space, but that rather "shadow spaces" (homomorphic spaces) can be constructed and that in so doing the quantum potential appears. The quantum potential approach can be seen as a way to construct the shadow spaces. The quantum potential thus results as a distortion due to the projection of the underlying space into $x$-space, in similar manner as a Mercator projection inevitably results in a distortion in a geographical map. There exists complete symmetry between the $x$-representation, and the quantum potential as it appears in configuration space can be seen as arising from the dispersion of the momentum $p$-representation.

The approach has been applied to extended phase space, also in terms of a Duffin–Kemmer–Petiau algebra approach.

== Relation to other quantities and theories ==
=== Relation to the Fisher information ===
It can be shown that the mean value of the quantum potential $Q = - \hbar^2 \nabla^2 \sqrt{\rho} / (2m \sqrt{\rho})$ is proportional to the probability density's Fisher information about the observable $\hat{x}$

$$\mathcal{I} = \int \rho \cdot (\nabla \ln \rho)^2 \, d^3x = - \int \rho \nabla^2 (\ln \rho) \, d^3x.$$

Using this definition for the Fisher information, we can write:

$$\langle Q \rangle = \int \psi^* Q \psi \, d^3x = \int \rho Q \, d^3x = \frac{\hbar^2}{8m} \mathcal{I}.$$

=== Quantum potential as energy of internal motion associated with spin ===
Giovanni Salesi, Erasmo Recami and co-workers showed in 1998 that, in agreement with the König's theorem, the quantum potential can be identified with the kinetic energy of the internal motion ("zitterbewegung") associated with the spin of a spin-1/2 particle observed in a center-of-mass frame. More specifically, they showed that the internal zitterbewegung velocity for a spinning, non-relativistic particle of constant spin with no precession, and in absence of an external field, has the squared value:

$$\mathbf V^2 = \frac{(\nabla \rho \land \mathbf s)^2} {(m \rho)^2} = \frac{(\nabla \rho)^2 \mathbf s^2 - (\nabla \rho \cdot \mathbf s)^2}{(m \rho)^2}$$

from which the second term is shown to be of negligible size; then with $| \mathbf s | = \hbar/2$ it follows that

$$| \mathbf V | = \frac{\hbar}{2} \frac{\nabla \rho}{m \rho}$$

Salesi gave further details on this work in 2009.

In 1999, Salvatore Esposito generalized their result from spin-1/2 particles to particles of arbitrary spin, confirming the interpretation of the quantum potential as a kinetic energy for an internal motion. Esposito showed that (using the notation $\hbar$=1) the quantum potential can be written as:

$$Q = - \frac{1}{2} m \mathbf v_S^2 - \frac{1}{2} \nabla \cdot \mathbf v_S$$

and that the causal interpretation of quantum mechanics can be reformulated in terms of a particle velocity

$$\mathbf v = \mathbf v_B + \mathbf v_S \times \mathbf s$$

where the "drift velocity" is

$$\mathbf v_B = \frac {\nabla S}{m}$$

and the "relative velocity" is $\mathbf v_S \times \mathbf s$, with

$$\mathbf v_S = \frac {\nabla R^2}{2m R^2}$$

and $\mathbf s$ representing the spin direction of the particle. In this formulation, according to Esposito, quantum mechanics must necessarily be interpreted in probabilistic terms, for the reason that a system's initial motion condition cannot be exactly determined. Esposito explained that "the quantum effects present in the Schrödinger equation are due to the presence of a peculiar spatial direction associated with the particle that, assuming the isotropy of space, can be identified with the spin of the particle itself". Esposito generalized it from matter particles to gauge particles, in particular photons, for which he showed that, if modelled as $\psi = (\mathbf E - i \mathbf B) / \sqrt 2$, with probability function $\psi^* \cdot \psi = (\mathbf E^2 + \mathbf B^2)/2$, they can be understood in a quantum potential approach.

James R. Bogan, in 2002, published the derivation of a reciprocal transformation from the Hamilton-Jacobi equation of classical mechanics to the time-dependent Schrödinger equation of quantum mechanics which arises from a gauge transformation representing spin, under the simple requirement of conservation of probability. This spin-dependent transformation is a function of the quantum potential.

== Re-interpretation in terms of Clifford algebras ==
B. Hiley and R. E. Callaghan re-interpret the role of the Bohm model and its notion of quantum potential in the framework of Clifford algebra, taking account of recent advances that include the work of David Hestenes on spacetime algebra. They show how, within a nested hierarchy of Clifford algebras $C\ell_{i,j}$, for each Clifford algebra an element of a minimal left ideal $\Phi_L(\mathbf r, t)$ and an element of a right ideal representing its Clifford conjugation $\Phi_R(\mathbf r, t) = \tilde{\Phi}_L(\mathbf r, t)$ can be constructed, and from it the Clifford density element (CDE) $\rho_c(\mathbf r, t) = \Phi_L(\mathbf r, t) \tilde{\Phi}_L(\mathbf r, t)$, an element of the Clifford algebra which is isomorphic to the standard density matrix but independent of any specific representation. On this basis, bilinear invariants can be formed which represent properties of the system. Hiley and Callaghan distinguish bilinear invariants of a first kind, of which each stands for the expectation value of an element $B$ of the algebra which can be formed as ${\rm Tr} B \rho_c$, and bilinear invariants of a second kind which are constructed with derivatives and represent momentum and energy. Using these terms, they reconstruct the results of quantum mechanics without depending on a particular representation in terms of a wave function nor requiring reference to an external Hilbert space. Consistent with earlier results, the quantum potential of a non-relativistic particle with spin (Pauli particle) is shown to have an additional spin-dependent term, and the momentum of a relativistic particle with spin (Dirac particle) is shown to consist in a linear motion and a rotational part. The two dynamical equations governing the time evolution are re-interpreted as conservation equations. One of them stands for the conservation of energy; the other stands for the conservation of probability and of spin. The quantum potential plays the role of an internal energy which ensures the conservation of total energy.

== Relativistic and field-theoretic extensions ==
=== Quantum potential and relativity ===
Bohm and Hiley demonstrated that the non-locality of quantum theory can be understood as limit case of a purely local theory, provided the transmission of active information is allowed to be greater than the speed of light, and that this limit case yields approximations to both quantum theory and relativity.

The quantum potential approach was extended by Hiley and co-workers to quantum field theory in Minkowski spacetime and to curved spacetime.

Carlo Castro and Jorge Mahecha derived the Schrödinger equation from the Hamilton-Jacobi equation in conjunction with the continuity equation, and showed that the properties of the relativistic Bohm quantum potential in terms of the ensemble density can be described by the Weyl properties of space. In Riemann flat space, the Bohm potential is shown to equal the Weyl curvature. According to Castro and Mahecha, in the relativistic case, the quantum potential (using the d'Alembert operator $\scriptstyle\Box$ and in the notation $\hbar=1$) takes the form

$$Q = - \frac {1}{2m} \frac {\quad \Box \sqrt \rho}{\sqrt \rho}$$

and the quantum force exerted by the relativistic quantum potential is shown to depend on the Weyl gauge potential and its derivatives. Furthermore, the relationship among Bohm's potential and the Weyl curvature in flat spacetime corresponds to a similar relationship among Fisher Information and Weyl geometry after introduction of a complex momentum.

Diego L. Rapoport, on the other hand, associates the relativistic quantum potential with the metric scalar curvature (Riemann curvature).

In relation to the Klein–Gordon equation for a particle with mass and charge, Peter R. Holland spoke in his book of 1993 of a "quantum potential-like term" that is proportional $\Box R/R$. He emphasized however that to give the Klein–Gordon theory a single-particle interpretation in terms of trajectories, as can be done for nonrelativistic Schrödinger quantum mechanics, would lead to unacceptable inconsistencies. For instance, wave functions $\psi(\mathbf{x},t)$ that are solutions to the Klein–Gordon or the Dirac equation cannot be interpreted as the probability amplitude for a particle to be found in a given volume $d^3 x$ at time $t$ in accordance with the usual axioms of quantum mechanics, and similarly in the causal interpretation it cannot be interpreted as the probability for the particle to be in that volume at that time. Holland pointed out that, while efforts have been made to determine a Hermitian position operator that would allow an interpretation of configuration space quantum field theory, in particular using the Newton–Wigner localization approach, but that no connection with possibilities for an empirical determination of position in terms of a relativistic measurement theory or for a trajectory interpretation has so far been established. Yet according to Holland this does not mean that the trajectory concept is to be discarded from considerations of relativistic quantum mechanics.

Hrvoje Nikolić derived $Q = - (1/2m) \, \Box R/R$ as expression for the quantum potential, and he proposed a Lorentz-covariant formulation of the Bohmian interpretation of many-particle wave functions. He also developed a generalized relativistic-invariant probabilistic interpretation of quantum theory, in which $|\psi|^2$ is no longer a probability density in space but a probability density in space-time.

=== Quantum potential in quantum field theory ===
Starting from the space representation of the field coordinate, a causal interpretation of the Schrödinger picture of relativistic quantum theory has been constructed. The Schrödinger picture for a neutral, spin 0, massless field $\Psi \left[ \psi(\mathbf{x},t) \right] = R \left[ \psi(\mathbf{x},t) \right] e^{S \left[ \psi(\mathbf{x},t) \right]}$, with $R \left[ \psi(\mathbf{x},t) \right], S \left[ \psi(\mathbf{x},t) \right]$ real-valued functionals, can be shown to lead to

$$Q \left[ \psi(\mathbf{x},t) \right] = - (1/2R) \int d^3 x \, \delta^2 R / \delta \psi^2$$

This has been called the superquantum potential by Bohm and his co-workers.

Basil Hiley showed that the energy–momentum-relations in the Bohm model can be obtained directly from the energy–momentum tensor of quantum field theory and that the quantum potential is an energy term that is required for local energy–momentum conservation. He has also hinted that for particle with energies equal to or higher than the pair creation threshold, Bohm's model constitutes a many-particle theory that describes also pair creation and annihilation processes.

== Interpretation and naming of the quantum potential ==
In his article of 1952, providing an alternative interpretation of quantum mechanics, Bohm already spoke of a "quantum-mechanical" potential.

Bohm and Basil Hiley also called the quantum potential an information potential, given that it influences the form of processes and is itself shaped by the environment. Bohm indicated "The ship or aeroplane (with its automatic Pilot) is a self-active system, i.e. it has its own energy. But the form of its activity is determined by the information content concerning its environment that is carried by the radar waves. This is independent of the intensity of the waves. We can similarly regard the quantum potential as containing active information. It is potentially active everywhere, but actually active only where and when there is a particle." (italics in original).

Hiley refers to the quantum potential as internal energy and as "a new quality of energy only playing a role in quantum processes". He explains that the quantum potential is a further energy term aside the well-known kinetic energy and the (classical) potential energy and that it is a nonlocal energy term that arises necessarily in view of the requirement of energy conservation; he added that much of the physics community's resistance against the notion of the quantum potential may have been due to scientists' expectations that energy should be local.

Hiley has emphasized that the quantum potential, for Bohm, was "a key element in gaining insights into what could underlie the quantum formalism. Bohm was convinced by his deeper analysis of this aspect of the approach that the theory could not be mechanical. Rather, it is organic in the sense of Whitehead. Namely, that it was the whole that determined the properties of the individual particles and their relationship, not the other way round."

Peter R. Holland, in his comprehensive textbook, also refers to it as quantum potential energy. The quantum potential is also referred to in association with Bohm's name as Bohm potential, quantum Bohm potential or Bohm quantum potential.

== Applications ==
The quantum potential approach can be used to model quantum effects without requiring the Schrödinger equation to be explicitly solved, and it can be integrated in simulations, such as Monte Carlo simulations using the hydrodynamic and drift diffusion equations. This is done in form of a "hydrodynamic" calculation of trajectories: starting from the density at each "fluid element", the acceleration of each "fluid element" is computed from the gradient of $V$ and $Q$, and the resulting divergence of the velocity field determines the change to the density.

The approach using Bohmian trajectories and the quantum potential is used for calculating properties of quantum systems which cannot be solved exactly, which are often approximated using semi-classical approaches. Whereas in mean field approaches the potential for the classical motion results from an average over wave functions, this approach does not require the computation of an integral over wave functions.

The expression for the quantum force has been used, together with Bayesian statistical analysis and expectation-maximisation methods, for computing ensembles of trajectories that arise under the influence of classical and quantum forces.
