= Weingard =

Weingard is a surname. Notable people with the surname include:

- Robbie Weingard (born 1963), American basketball player
- Robert Weingard (1942–1996), American philosopher of science
