= Quantum solvent =

Superfluid used to dissolve another chemical species

A quantum solvent is essentially a superfluid (aka a quantum liquid) used to dissolve another chemical species. Any superfluid can theoretically act as a quantum solvent, but in practice the only viable superfluid medium that can currently be used is helium-4, and it has been successfully accomplished in controlled conditions. Such solvents are currently under investigation for use in spectroscopic techniques in the field of analytical chemistry, due to their superior kinetic properties.

Any matter dissolved (or otherwise suspended) in the superfluid will tend to aggregate together in clumps, encapsulated by a 'quantum solvation shell'. Due to the totally frictionless nature of the superfluid medium, the entire object then proceeds to act very much like a nanoscopic ball bearing, allowing effectively complete rotational freedom of the solvated chemical species. A quantum solvation shell consists of a region of non-superfluid helium-4 atoms that surround the molecule(s) and exhibit adiabatic following around the centre of gravity of the solute. As such, the kinetics of an effectively gaseous molecule can be studied without the need to use an actual gas (which can be impractical or impossible). It is necessary to make a small alteration to the rotational constant of the chemical species being examined, in order to compensate for the higher mass entailed by the quantum solvation shell.

Quantum solvation has so far been achieved with a number of organic, inorganic and organometallic compounds, and it has been speculated that as well as the obvious use in the field of spectroscopy, quantum solvents could be used as tools in nanoscale chemical engineering, perhaps to manufacture components for use in nanotechnology.
