= Antony Valentini =

British theoretical physicist (born 1965)

- Born: Antony Valentini; 28 January 1965 (age 61); Greenwich, London, England
- Education: Trinity College, Cambridge (BA, 1986); International School for Advanced Studies (PhD, 1992)
- Scientific career
- Fields: General relativity; Quantum physics
- Workplaces: Clemson University; Perimeter Institute for Theoretical Physics; Imperial College London; University of Rome
- Thesis: On the Pilot-Wave Theory of Classical, Quantum and Subquantum Physics (1992)
- Doctoral advisor: Dennis Sciama

Antony Valentini (born 28 January 1965) is a British-Italian theoretical physicist and author known for his work on the foundations of quantum physics.

== Education and career ==
Valentini obtained an undergraduate degree from Cambridge University, then earned his Ph.D. in 1992 with Dennis Sciama at the International School for Advanced Studies (ISAS-SISSA) in Trieste, Italy. In 1999, after seven years in Italy, he took up a post-doc grant to work at the Imperial College with Lee Smolin and Christopher Isham.

He worked at the Perimeter Institute for Theoretical Physics. In February 2011, he became professor of physics and astronomy at Clemson University; as of 2022, he was listed as adjunct faculty.

Together with Mike Towler, Royal Society research fellow of the University of Cambridge's Cavendish Laboratory, he organized a conference on the de Broglie-Bohm theory the Apuan Alps Centre for Physics in August 2010, hosted by the Towler Institute located in Vallico di Sotto in Tuscany, Italy, which is loosely associated with the Theory of Condensed Matter group of the Cavendish Laboratory. Among the questions announced for discussion, the organizers included "Why should young people be interested in these ideas, when showing interest in quantum foundations still might harm their careers?"

== Work ==
Valentini has been working on an extension of the causal interpretation of quantum theory. This interpretation had been proposed in conceptual terms in 1927 by Louis de Broglie, was independently re-discovered by David Bohm who brought it to a complete and systematic form in 1952, and was expanded on by Bohm and Basil Hiley. Emphasizing de Broglie's contribution, Valentini has consistently referred to the causal interpretation of quantum mechanics underlying his work as the "de Broglie–Bohm theory".

=== Quantum equilibrium, locality and uncertainty ===
In 1991, Valentini provided indications for deriving the quantum equilibrium hypothesis which states that $\rho(x,y,z,t)=|\psi(x,y,z,t)|^2$ in the frame work of the pilot wave theory. Valentini showed that the relaxation $\rho(x,y,z,t)$ → $|\psi(x,y,z,t)|^2$ may be accounted for by a H-theorem constructed in analogy to the Boltzmann H-theorem of statistical mechanics. Valentini showed that his expansion of the De Broglie–Bohm theory would allow "signal nonlocality" for non-equilibrium cases in which $\rho(x,y,z,t)$ ≠$|\psi(x,y,z,t)|^2$. According to Valentini, the universe is fundamentally nonlocal, and quantum theory merely describes a special equilibrium state in which nonlocality is hidden in statistical noise. He furthermore showed that an ensemble of particles with known wave function and known nonequilibrium distribution could be used to perform, on another system, measurements that violate the uncertainty principle.

In 1992, Valentini extended pilot wave theory to spin-$1/2$ fields and to gravitation.

=== Background and implications ===
Valentini has been described as an "ardent admirer of de Broglie". He noted that "de Broglie (rather like Maxwell) emphasized an underlying 'mechanical' picture: particles were assumed to be singularities of physical waves in space". He emphasized that de Broglie, with the assistance of Erwin Schrödinger, had constructed pilot wave theory, but later abandoned it in favor of quantum formalism.

Valentini's derivation of the quantum equilibrium hypothesis was criticized by Detlef Dürr and co-workers in 1992, and the derivation of the quantum equilibrium hypothesis has remained a topic of active investigation.

"Signal nonlocality", which is forbidden in orthodox quantum theory, would allow nonlocal quantum entanglement to be used as a stand-alone communication channel without the need of a classical light-speed limited retarded signal to unlock the entangled message from the sender to the receiver. This would possibly make the string theory landscape Popper falsifiable.

== Personal life ==
Antony Valentini is married to art historian Vivien Bird and has a stepdaughter, Sophie. They live in London.

In January of 2014, Antony Valentini reached out to the infamous Jeffery Epstein in hopes of receiving funding for research.

== Publications ==
Books

- Antony Valentini: Beyond the Quantum: A Quest for the Origin and Hidden Meaning of Quantum Mechanics, Oxford Univ. Press, 2025, IBSN 0198853742
- Guido Bacciagaluppi, Antony Valentini: Quantum theory at the crossroads: Reconsidering the 1927 Solvay Conference, Cambridge Univ. Press, 2009, ISBN 978-0-521-81421-8

Articles

- Antony Valentini, Hans Westman: Dynamical origin of quantum probabilities, Proceedings of the Royal Society A 8, vol. 461, no. 2053 p. 253-272, January 2005, doi:10.1098/rspa.2004.1394
- Antony Valentini: Subquantum information and computation, 2002, Pramana Journal of Physics, vol. 59, no. 2, August 2002, p. 269–277
- Antony Valentini: Signal-locality in hidden-variables theories, Physics Letters A, vol. 297, no. 5-6, 20 May 2002, p. 273-278 online from arxiv.org
- Antony Valentini: Hidden Variables, Statistical Mechanics and the Early Universe, Chance in Physics, Lecture Notes in Physics, Springer 2001, Volume 574/2001, 165–181, doi:10.1007/3-540-44966-3_12 arXiv:quant-ph/0104067
- Antony Valentini: On Galilean and Lorentz invariance in pilot-wave dynamics, Physics Letters A, 228, 215–222, 1997 online from arxiv.org
- Antony Valentini: Pilot-wave theory of fields, gravitation and cosmology, in: James T. Cushing, Arthur Fine, Sheldon Goldstein (eds.): Bohmian mechanics and quantum theory: an appraisal, Kluwer Academic Publishers, 1996, p. 45–66 (a brief outline by Valentini of his work of 1991–1996 on the de Broglie–Bohm theory)
- Antony Valentini: On the Pilot-Wave Theory of Classical, Quantum and Subquantum Physics, Ph.D. Thesis, ISAS, Trieste 1992
- Antony Valentini: Signal-locality, uncertainty, and the sub-quantum H-theorem, II, Physics Letters A, vol. 158, no. 1, 1991, p. 1–8
- Antony Valentini: Signal-locality, uncertainty, and the sub-quantum H-theorem, I, Physics Letters A, vol. 156, no. 5, 1991
- Antony Valentini: Resolution of causality violation in the classical radiation reaction, Physical Review Letters vol. 61, no. 17, p. 1903–1905, 1988
