= Nicholas Monk =

Nicholas Monk may refer to:

- Nicholas Monck (1610–1661), bishop of Hereford and provost of Eton College
- Nicholas A. M. Monk, British mathematician
- Nicholas Monk (literary critic), British literary critic
- Nick Monk, a member of Spiders (British band)
