= CASINO =

CASINO is a quantum Monte Carlo program that was originally developed in the Theory of Condensed Matter group at the Cavendish Laboratory in Cambridge. CASINO can be used to perform variational quantum Monte Carlo and diffusion quantum Monte Carlo simulations to calculate the energy and distribution of electrons in atoms, molecules and crystals.

The principal authors of this program are R. J. Needs, M. D. Towler, N. D. Drummond and P. Lopez Rios.

== See also ==
- Quantum chemistry computer programs
