= Quantum hydrodynamics =

Topic in condensed matter physics

In condensed matter physics, quantum hydrodynamics (QHD) is most generally the study of hydrodynamic-like systems which demonstrate quantum mechanical behavior. They arise in semiclassical mechanics in the study of metal and semiconductor devices, in which case being derived from the Boltzmann transport equation combined with Wigner quasiprobability distribution. In quantum chemistry they arise as solutions to chemical kinetic systems, in which case they are derived from the Schrödinger equation by way of Madelung equations.

An important system of study in quantum hydrodynamics is that of superfluidity. Some other topics of interest in quantum hydrodynamics are quantum turbulence, quantized vortices, second and third sound, and quantum solvents. The quantum hydrodynamic equation is an equation in Bohmian mechanics, which, it turns out, has a mathematical relationship to classical fluid dynamics (see Madelung equations).

Some common experimental applications of these studies are in liquid helium (^{3}He and ^{4}He), and of the interior of neutron stars and the quark–gluon plasma. Many famous scientists have worked in quantum hydrodynamics, including Richard Feynman, Lev Landau, and Pyotr Kapitsa.

== See also ==
- Quantum turbulence
- Hydrodynamic quantum analogs
