= Peter R. Holland =

English theoretical physicist

Peter R. Holland is an English theoretical physicist, known for his work on foundational problems in quantum physics and in particular his book on the pilot wave theory and the de Broglie-Bohm causal interpretation of quantum mechanics.

Holland was educated at Hazelwick Comprehensive School in Crawley, West Sussex and at Imperial College. He did his PhD on algebraic topological methods in physics under David Bohm at Birkbeck College.

Holland has worked at the University of London, Universite Pierre et Marie Curie (Paris), Bristol UWE and the University of Oxford. He is an editor of Physics Letters A.

In 1993, Holland published his book "The Quantum Theory of Motion’’ in which he presented a comprehensive account of the causal interpretation of quantum mechanics initiated by Louis de Broglie and, in a more complete form, by David Bohm.

Recent work

Drawing upon numerical trajectory-based methods for solving the Schrödinger equation, and upon methods of hydrodynamics, Holland showed in 2004 how the time evolution of the wavefunction could be derived exactly from the dynamical evolution of a congruence of spacetime trajectories. The method achieves the same result as Richard Feynman's path integral formulation (the mapping of the initial wavefunction through time) but, instead of using Feynman's 'all possible paths' between two points, it employs at most one path. This is a considerable conceptual advantage in understanding quantum motion and is potentially a computational benefit too. Another difference with Feynman is that, while the trajectories do the job of evolving the quantum system in time, the initial wavefunction is integral to the trajectory dynamical equations, as it provides the initial density and the initial velocity. Using Riemannian geometry Holland formulated this method in very general terms that include as special cases quantum many-particle systems and spin. He has applied it to other field theories, such as electromagnetism and second-order wave equations.

Holland has published many peer-reviewed articles on the foundations of physics including the quantum potential, quantum hydrodynamics, quantum field theory, symmetries, hidden-variables theories, quantum back-reaction, quantum Hamilton-Jacobi theory, classical-like quantum systems, and the history of physics.

== Publications ==
Book

- Peter R. Holland: The Quantum Theory of Motion: An Account of the De Broglie-Bohm Causal Interpretation of Quantum Mechanics, Cambridge University Press, Cambridge (first published 25 June 1993), ISBN 0-521-35404-8 hardback, ISBN 0-521-48543-6 paperback, transferred to digital printing 2004 and available as an e-book from 2010

Selected recent articles

- P. Holland: Quantum potential energy as concealed motion, Found. Phys. 45 (2015) doi:10.1007/s10701-014-9852-7 arXiv:1410.0165
- P. Holland: On systems having Poincaré and Galileo symmetry, Ann. Phys. (NY) 351, 935 (2014) doi:10.1016/j.aop.2014.10.009 arXiv:1409.5628
- P. Holland: The roads not taken: empty waves, wavefunction collapse and protective measurement in quantum theory in Protective Measurement and Quantum Reality, ed. S. Gao (Cambridge University Press, 2014) ISBN 9781107069633 arXiv:1409.5817
- P. Holland: Dynamics-dependent symmetries in Newtonian mechanics, Phys. Scr. 89, 015101 (2014) doi:10.1088/0031-8949/89/01/015101 arXiv:1409.5619
- P. Holland: Symmetries and conservation laws in the Lagrangian picture of quantum hydrodynamics, in Concepts and Methods in Modern Theoretical Chemistry: Statistical Mechanics, eds. S.K. Ghosh and P.K. Chattaraj (Taylor & Francis/CRC, Boca Raton, 2013) ISBN 9780367380311 arXiv:1211.0983
- P. Holland: Hydrodynamics, particle relabelling and relativity, Int. J. Theor. Phys. 51, 667 (2012) doi:10.1007/s10773-011-0946-0 arXiv:1105.3764 ([quant.flu-dyn], [quant-ph]), 18 May 2011
- P. Holland: A quantum of history, Contemp. Phys. 52, 355 (2011) doi:10.1080/00107514.2011.582160 arXiv:1409.5956
- P. Holland: Quantum field dynamics from trajectories, in Quantum Trajectories, Ed. P. Chattaraj (Taylor & Francis/CRC, Boca Raton, 2010) article
- P. Holland: Foreword, in Quantum Trajectories, ed. P. Chattaraj (Taylor & Francis/CRC, Boca Raton, 2010) article
- P. Holland: Spin-like current from phase space distributions, J. Phys. A: Math. Theor. 42, 135304 (2009) article; arXiv: arXiv:0901.0402
- P. Holland: Schrödinger dynamics as a two-phase conserved flow: an alternative trajectory construction of quantum propagation, J. Phys. A: Math. Theor. 42, 075307 (2009) article; arXiv:0807.4482
- P. Holland: Hidden variables as computational tools: the construction of a relativistic spinor field, Found. Phys. 36, 369–384 (2006) (article; full text preprint)
- P. Holland: Quantum back-reaction and the particle law of motion, J. Phys. A: Math. Gen. 39, 559 (2006) article online 26 October 2005
- P. Holland: What’s wrong with Einstein’s 1927 hidden-variable interpretation of quantum mechanics?, Found. Phys. 35, 177–196 (2005) article arXiv:quant-ph/0401017
- P. Holland: Hydrodynamic construction of the electromagnetic field, Proc. R. Soc. A 461, 3659–3679 (2005) (article; full text preprint)
- P. Holland: Computing the wavefunction from trajectories: particle and wave pictures in quantum mechanics and their relation, Ann. Phys. (NY) 315, 505–531 (2005) article (arXiv:quant-ph/0405145 submitted 25 May 2004)
- H. R. Brown, P. Holland: Dynamical vs. variational symmetries: Understanding Noether’s first theorem, Mol. Phys. 102, (11–12 Spec. Iss), 1133–1139 (2004) PITT-PHIL-SCI 2194, online
- P. Holland: Uniqueness of conserved currents in quantum mechanics, Ann. Phys. (Leipzig) 12, 446–462 (2003) article arXiv:quant-ph/0305175
- H. R. Brown, P. Holland: Simple applications of Noether’s first theorem in quantum mechanics and electromagnetism, Am. J. Phys. 72 (1), 34–39 (2004) arXiv:quant-ph/0302062 online
- P. Holland, C. Philippidis: Implications of Lorentz covariance for the guidance formula in two-slit quantum interference, Phys. Rev. A 67, 062105 (2003) article arXiv:quant-ph/0302076
- P. Holland, H. R. Brown: The non-relativistic limit of the Maxwell and Dirac equations: The role of Galilean and gauge invariance, Stud. Hist. Phil. Mod. Phys. 34, 161–187 (2003) article PITT-PHIL-SCI 999, archive
- P. Holland: Hamiltonian theory of wave and particle in quantum mechanics II: Hamilton-Jacobi theory and particle back-reaction, Nuovo Cimento B 116, 1143–1172 (2001) (bibliographic reference; full text preprint)
- P. Holland: Hamiltonian theory of wave and particle in quantum mechanics I: Liouville’s theorem and the interpretation of the de Broglie-Bohm theory, Nuovo Cimento B 116, 1043–1070 (2001) (bibliographic reference; full text preprint)
