= Jean-Pierre Vigier =

French theoretical physicist

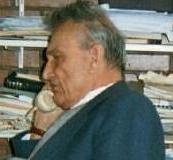
Jean-Pierre Vigier in his Paris office in 2003

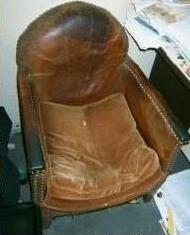
Nobel Laureate Louis de Broglie's office chair

Jean-Pierre Vigier (16 January 1920 – 4 May 2004) was a French theoretical physicist, known for his work on the foundations of physics, in particular on his stochastic interpretation of quantum physics.

== Education ==
A native of Paris, Vigier earned his PhD in mathematics from University of Geneva in 1946 with a study on Infinite Sequences of Hermitian Operators. In 1948 he was appointed assistant to Louis de Broglie, a position he held until the latter's retirement in 1962. Vigier was professor emeritus in the Department of Gravitational Physics at Pierre et Marie Curie University in Paris. He authored more than 300 scientific papers, and co-authored and edited a number of books and conference proceedings. He was a member of the editorial board of Physics Letters A.

Vigier was a proponent of the stochastic interpretation of quantum mechanics, which was based on the ideas of de Broglie and David Bohm. Politically, Vigier was an active supporter of communism throughout his life.

Vigier was invited to be Einstein's assistant; but at the time because of his political controversy related to Vietnam the United States Department of State would not allow him entry into the United States.

Vigier died in 2004 in Paris.

== Family ==
Vigier's father was a professor of English, such that Vigier became fluent in English and French, his native language.

== Publications ==
Books

- Myron W. Evans, Jean-Pierre Vigier: The Enigmatic Photon (series in several volumes), Kluwer Academic, 1996, ISBN 0-7923-4044-2
- Louis de Broglie, P A M Dirac, Eugene Paul Wigner, A O Barut, Alwyn Van der Merwe, Jean-Pierre Vigier: Quantum, space, and time — the quest continues: studies and essays in honour of Louis de Broglie, Paul Dirac, and Eugene Wigner, Cambridge Monographs on Physics, ISBN 978-0-521-31911-9. Originally published in Foundations of physics, 1982-1983.
- Yann Fitt, Alexandre Faire, Jean Pierre Vigier: The world economic crisis: U.S. imperialism at bay, Zed Press, 1980, ISBN 978-0-905762-53-1
- Jean-Pierre Vigier: France's May revolution: an analysis of the French May revolt, Sydney: International Publications, 1968
- Louis de Broglie; Jean Pierre Vigier: Introduction to the Vigier theory of elementary particles: with a chapter by Jean-Pierre Vigier, Elsevier, 1963
- Pierre Hillion, Jean-Pierre Vigier: Les Ondes associées à une structure interne des particules. Sur les équations d'ondes associées à la structure des bosons. Sur les équations d'ondes associées à la structure des fermions (On wave equations associated with an internal structure of particles), Annales de l'Institut Henri Poincaré, vol. 17, no. 3, 1962
- Jean-Pierre Vigier: Recherches sur l'interprétation causale de la théorie des quanta (Research on the causal interpretation of quantum theory), Thèse d'Etat, Université de Paris, Faculté des sciences, 1954. Published by Gauthier-Villars, 1955.

=== Conference proceedings in honour of Jean-Pierre Vigier ===
- G. Hunter, S. Jeffers, J. P. Vigier: Causality and Locality in Modern Physics, Proceedings of a symposium held in honour of Jean-Pierre Vigier at York University, Toronto, Canada, in August 1997, Springer, 1998, ISBN 978-90-481-5092-2
- S. Jeffers, J. P. Vigier, S. Roy: The present status of the quantum theory of light: Proceedings of a symposium in honour of Jean-Pierre Vigier, Proceedings of a symposium held in honour of Jean-Pierre Vigier in Toronto, Canada, in August 1995, Kluwer Academic, 1996, ISBN 978-0-7923-4337-0

=== Articles (selection) ===
- Vigier, Jean-Pierre (1995). "Derivation of inertial forces from the Einstein-de Broglie-Bohm (E.d.B.B.) causal stochastic interpretation of quantum mechanics". Foundations of Physics. 25 (10). Springer Science and Business Media LLC: 1461–1494. doi:10.1007/bf02057462. ISSN 0015-9018.
- Vigier, Jean-Pierre (1991). "Explicit mathematical construction of relativistic nonlinear de Broglie waves described by three-dimensional (wave and electromagnetic) solitons "piloted" (controlled) by corresponding solutions of associated linear Klein-Gordon and Schrödinger equations". Foundations of Physics. 21 (2). Springer Science and Business Media LLC: 125–148. doi:10.1007/bf01889529. ISSN 0015-9018.
- Vigier, Jean-Pierre (1989). "Particular solutions of a non-linear Schrödinger equation carrying particle-like singularities represent possible models of de Broglie's double solution theory". Physics Letters A. 135 (2). Elsevier BV: 99–105. doi:10.1016/0375-9601(89)90653-1. ISSN 0375-9601.
- Garuccio, Augusto; Rapisarda, Vittorio; Vigier, Jean-Pierre (1982). "New experimental set-up for the detection of de Broglie waves". Physics Letters A. 90 (1–2). Elsevier BV: 17–19. doi:10.1016/0375-9601(82)90038-x. ISSN 0375-9601.
- Garuccio, Augusto; Popper, Karl R.; Vigier, Jean-Pierre (1981). "Possible direct physical detection of de Broglie waves". Physics Letters A. 86 (8). Elsevier BV: 397–400. doi:10.1016/0375-9601(81)90346-7. ISSN 0375-9601.
- de Broglie, Louis; Vigier, Jean Pierre (1972-04-10). "Photon Mass and New Experimental Results on Longitudinal Displacements of Laser Beams near Total Reflection". Physical Review Letters. 28 (15). American Physical Society (APS): 1001–1004. doi:10.1103/physrevlett.28.1001. ISSN 0031-9007.
- De Broglie, Louis; Bohm, David; Hillion, Pierre; Halbwachs, Francis; Takabayasi, Takehiko; Vigier, Jean-Pierre (1963-01-01). "Rotator Model of Elementary Particles Considered as Relativistic Extended Structures in Minkowski Space". Physical Review. 129 (1). American Physical Society (APS): 438–450. doi:10.1103/physrev.129.438. ISSN 0031-899X.
- Bohm, D.; Vigier, J. P. (1954-10-01). "Model of the Causal Interpretation of Quantum Theory in Terms of a Fluid with Irregular Fluctuations". Physical Review. 96 (1). American Physical Society (APS): 208–216. doi:10.1103/physrev.96.208. ISSN 0031-899X.
