= De Broglie–Bohm theory =

Interpretation of quantum mechanics

The de Broglie–Bohm theory, also known as the pilot wave theory, Bohmian mechanics, and the causal interpretation, is an interpretation of quantum mechanics that postulates that, in addition to the wave function, a particle possesses a definite position at all times, even when unobserved.

The evolution over time of the configuration of all particles is defined by a guiding equation. The evolution of the wave function over time is given by the Schrödinger equation. The interpretation is named after Louis de Broglie and David Bohm.

The interpretation is deterministic and explicitly nonlocal: the velocity of any one particle depends on the value of the guiding equation, which depends on the configuration of all the particles under consideration.

Measurements are a particular case of quantum processes described by the theory—for which it yields the same quantum predictions as other interpretations of quantum mechanics. The interpretation does not have a "measurement problem", due to the fact that the particles have a definite configuration at all times. The Born rule in de Broglie–Bohm theory is not a postulate. Rather, in this theory, the link between the probability density and the wave function has the status of a theorem, a result of a separate postulate, the "quantum equilibrium hypothesis", which is additional to the basic principles governing the wave function. There are several equivalent mathematical formulations of the interpretation.

== Overview ==
De Broglie–Bohm theory is based on the following postulates:

- There is a configuration $q$ of the universe, described by coordinates $q^k$, which is an element of the configuration space $Q$. The configuration space is different for different versions of the pilot wave theory. For example, this may be the space of positions $\mathbf{Q}_k$ of $N$ particles, or, in case of field theory, the space of field configurations $\phi(x)$. The configuration evolves (for spin=0) according to the guiding equation
  $$m_k \frac{d q^k}{dt}(t) = \hbar \nabla_k \operatorname{Im} \ln\psi(q,t) = \hbar \operatorname{Im}\left(\frac{\nabla_k \psi}{\psi}\right)(q, t) = \frac{m_k \mathbf{j}_k}{\psi^*\psi} = \operatorname{Re}\left(\frac{\mathbf{\hat P}_k\Psi}{\Psi}\right),$$
  where $\mathbf{j}$ is the probability current or probability flux, and $\mathbf{\hat P}$ is the momentum operator. Here, $\psi(q,t)$ is the standard complex-valued wavefunction from quantum theory, which evolves according to the Schrödinger equation
  $$i\hbar \frac{\partial}{\partial t}\psi(q,t) = - \sum_{i=1}^{N} \frac{\hbar^2}{2m_i} \nabla_i^2 \psi(q,t) + V(q)\psi(q,t).$$
  This completes the specification of the theory for any quantum theory with Hamilton operator of type $H =\sum \frac{1}{2m_i}\hat{p}_i^2 + V(\hat{q})$.
- The configuration is distributed according to $|\psi(q,t)|^2$ at some moment of time $t$, and this consequently holds for all times. Such a state is named quantum equilibrium. With quantum equilibrium, this theory agrees with the results of standard quantum mechanics.

Even though this latter relation is frequently presented as an axiom of the theory, Bohm presented it as derivable from statistical-mechanical arguments in the original papers of 1952. This argument was further supported by the work of Bohm in 1953 and was substantiated by Vigier and Bohm's paper of 1954, in which they introduced stochastic fluid fluctuations that drive a process of asymptotic relaxation from quantum non-equilibrium to quantum equilibrium (ρ →|ψ|^{2}).

=== Double-slit experiment ===
The Bohmian trajectories for an electron going through the two-slit experiment. A similar pattern was also extrapolated from weak measurements of single photons.

The double-slit experiment is an illustration of wave–particle duality. In it, a beam of particles (such as electrons) travels through a barrier that has two slits. If a detector screen is on the side beyond the barrier, the pattern of detected particles shows interference fringes characteristic of waves arriving at the screen from two sources (the two slits); however, the interference pattern is made up of individual dots corresponding to particles that had arrived on the screen. The system seems to exhibit the behaviour of both waves (interference patterns) and particles (dots on the screen).

If this experiment is modified so that one slit is closed, no interference pattern is observed. Thus, the state of both slits affects the final results. It can also be arranged to have a minimally invasive detector at one of the slits to detect which slit the particle went through. When that is done, the interference pattern disappears.

In de Broglie–Bohm theory, the wavefunction is defined at both slits, but each particle has a well-defined trajectory that passes through exactly one of the slits. The final position of the particle on the detector screen and the slit through which the particle passes is determined by the initial position of the particle. Such initial position is not knowable or controllable by the experimenter, so there is an appearance of randomness in the pattern of detection. In Bohm's 1952 papers he used the wavefunction to construct a quantum potential that, when included in Newton's equations, gave the trajectories of the particles streaming through the two slits. In effect the wavefunction interferes with itself and guides the particles by the quantum potential in such a way that the particles avoid the regions in which the interference is destructive and are attracted to the regions in which the interference is constructive, resulting in the interference pattern on the detector screen.

To explain the behavior when the particle is detected to go through one slit, one needs to appreciate the role of the conditional wavefunction and how it results in the collapse of the wavefunction; this is explained below. The basic idea is that the environment registering the detection effectively separates the two wave packets in configuration space.

== Formulation ==
=== Pilot wave theory ===
The de Broglie–Bohm theory describes a pilot wave $\psi(q,t) \in \mathbb{C}$ in a configuration space $Q$ and trajectories $q(t) \in Q$ of particles as in classical mechanics but defined by non-Newtonian mechanics. At every moment of time there exists not only a wavefunction, but also a well-defined configuration of the whole universe (i.e., the system as defined by the boundary conditions used in solving the Schrödinger equation).

The de Broglie–Bohm theory works on particle positions and trajectories like classical mechanics but the dynamics are different. In classical mechanics, the accelerations of the particles are imparted directly by forces, which exist in physical three-dimensional space. In de Broglie–Bohm theory, the quantum "field exerts a new kind of "quantum-mechanical" force". Bohm hypothesized that each particle has a "complex and subtle inner structure" that provides the capacity to react to the information provided by the wavefunction by the quantum potential. Also, unlike in classical mechanics, physical properties (e.g., mass, charge) are spread out over the wavefunction in de Broglie–Bohm theory, not localized at the position of the particle.

The wavefunction itself, and not the particles, determines the dynamical evolution of the system: the particles do not act back onto the wave function. As Bohm and Hiley worded it, "the Schrödinger equation for the quantum field does not have sources, nor does it have any other way by which the field could be directly affected by the condition of the particles [...] the quantum theory can be understood completely in terms of the assumption that the quantum field has no sources or other forms of dependence on the particles". P. Holland considers this lack of reciprocal action of particles and wave function to be one "[a]mong the many nonclassical properties exhibited by this theory". Holland later called this a merely apparent lack of back reaction, due to the incompleteness of the description.

In what follows below, the setup for one particle moving in $\mathbb{R}^3$ is given followed by the setup for N particles moving in 3 dimensions. In the first instance, configuration space and real space are the same, while in the second, real space is still $\mathbb{R}^3$, but configuration space becomes $\mathbb{R}^{3N}$. While the particle positions themselves are in real space, the velocity field and wavefunction are on configuration space, which is how particles are entangled with each other in this theory.

Extensions to this theory include spin and more complicated configuration spaces.

We use variations of $\mathbf{Q}$ for particle positions, while $\psi$ represents the complex-valued wavefunction on configuration space.

=== Guiding equation ===
For a spinless single particle moving in $\mathbb{R}^3$, the particle's velocity is

$$\frac{d\mathbf{Q}}{dt}(t) = \frac{\hbar}{m} \operatorname{Im}\left(\frac{\nabla \psi}{\psi}\right)(\mathbf{Q}, t).$$

For many particles labeled $\mathbf{Q}_k$ for the $k$-th particle their velocities are

$$\frac{d\mathbf{Q}_k}{dt}(t) = \frac{\hbar}{m_k} \operatorname{Im}\left(\frac{\nabla_k \psi}{\psi}\right)(\mathbf{Q}_1, \mathbf{Q}_2, \ldots, \mathbf{Q}_N, t).$$

The main fact to notice is that this velocity field depends on the actual positions of all of the $N$ particles in the universe. As explained below, in most experimental situations, the influence of all of those particles can be encapsulated into an effective wavefunction for a subsystem of the universe.

=== Schrödinger equation ===
The one-particle Schrödinger equation governs the time evolution of a complex-valued wavefunction on $\mathbb{R}^3$. The equation represents a quantized version of the total energy of a classical system evolving under a real-valued potential function $V$ on $\mathbb{R}^3$:

$$i\hbar\frac{\partial}{\partial t}\psi = -\frac{\hbar^2}{2m}\nabla^2\psi + V\psi.$$

For many particles, the equation is the same except that $\psi$ and $V$ are now on configuration space, $\mathbb{R}^{3N}$:

$$i\hbar\frac{\partial}{\partial t}\psi = -\sum_{k=1}^{N}\frac{\hbar^2}{2m_k}\nabla_k^2\psi + V\psi.$$

This is the same wavefunction as in conventional quantum mechanics.

=== Relation to the Born rule ===
In Bohm's original papers, he discusses how de Broglie–Bohm theory results in the usual measurement results of quantum mechanics. The main idea is that this is true if the positions of the particles satisfy the statistical distribution given by $|\psi|^2$. And that distribution is guaranteed to be true for all time by the guiding equation if the initial distribution of the particles satisfies $|\psi|^2$.

For a given experiment, one can postulate this as being true and verify it experimentally. But, as argued by Dürr et al., one needs to argue that this distribution for subsystems is typical. The authors argue that $|\psi|^2$, by virtue of its equivariance under the dynamical evolution of the system, is the appropriate measure of typicality for initial conditions of the positions of the particles. The authors then prove that the vast majority of possible initial configurations will give rise to statistics obeying the Born rule (i.e., $|\psi|^2$) for measurement outcomes. In summary, in a universe governed by the de Broglie–Bohm dynamics, Born rule behavior is typical.

The situation is thus analogous to the situation in classical statistical physics. A low-entropy initial condition will, with overwhelmingly high probability, evolve into a higher-entropy state: behavior consistent with the second law of thermodynamics is typical. There are anomalous initial conditions that would give rise to violations of the second law; however in the absence of some very detailed evidence supporting the realization of one of those conditions, it would be quite unreasonable to expect anything but the actually observed uniform increase of entropy. Similarly in the de Broglie–Bohm theory, there are anomalous initial conditions that would produce measurement statistics in violation of the Born rule (conflicting the predictions of standard quantum theory), but the typicality theorem shows that absent some specific reason to believe one of those special initial conditions was in fact realized, the Born rule behavior is what one should expect.

It is in this qualified sense that the Born rule is, for the de Broglie–Bohm theory, a theorem rather than (as in ordinary quantum theory) an additional postulate.

It can also be shown that a distribution of particles which is not distributed according to the Born rule (that is, a distribution "out of quantum equilibrium") and evolving under the de Broglie–Bohm dynamics is overwhelmingly likely to evolve dynamically into a state distributed as $|\psi|^2$.

=== The conditional wavefunction of a subsystem ===
In the formulation of the de Broglie–Bohm theory, there is only a wavefunction for the entire universe (which always evolves by the Schrödinger equation). Here, the "universe" is simply the system limited by the same boundary conditions used to solve the Schrödinger equation. However, once the theory is formulated, it is convenient to introduce a notion of wavefunction also for subsystems of the universe. Let us write the wavefunction of the universe as $\psi(t, q^\text{I}, q^\text{II})$, where $q^\text{I}$ denotes the configuration variables associated to some subsystem (I) of the universe, and $q^\text{II}$ denotes the remaining configuration variables. Denote respectively by $Q^\text{I}(t)$ and $Q^\text{II}(t)$ the actual configuration of subsystem (I) and of the rest of the universe. For simplicity, we consider here only the spinless case. The conditional wavefunction of subsystem (I) is defined by

$$\psi^\text{I}(t, q^\text{I}) = \psi(t, q^\text{I}, Q^\text{II}(t)).$$

It follows immediately from the fact that $Q(t) = (Q^\text{I}(t), Q^\text{II}(t))$ satisfies the guiding equation that also the configuration $Q^\text{I}(t)$ satisfies a guiding equation identical to the one presented in the formulation of the theory, with the universal wavefunction $\psi$ replaced with the conditional wavefunction $\psi^\text{I}$. Also, the fact that $Q(t)$ is random with probability density given by the square modulus of $\psi(t,\cdot)$ implies that the conditional probability density of $Q^\text{I}(t)$ given $Q^\text{II}(t)$ is given by the square modulus of the (normalized) conditional wavefunction $\psi^\text{I}(t,\cdot)$ (in the terminology of Dürr et al. this fact is called the fundamental conditional probability formula).

Unlike the universal wavefunction, the conditional wavefunction of a subsystem does not always evolve by the Schrödinger equation, but in many situations it does. For instance, if the universal wavefunction factors as

$$\psi(t, q^\text{I} ,q^\text{II}) = \psi^\text{I}(t, q^\text{I}) \psi^\text{II}(t, q^\text{II}),$$

then the conditional wavefunction of subsystem (I) is (up to an irrelevant scalar factor) equal to $\psi^\text{I}$ (this is what standard quantum theory would regard as the wavefunction of subsystem (I)). If, in addition, the Hamiltonian does not contain an interaction term between subsystems (I) and (II), then $\psi^\text{I}$ does satisfy a Schrödinger equation. More generally, assume that the universal wave function $\psi$ can be written in the form

$$\psi(t, q^\text{I}, q^\text{II}) = \psi^\text{I}(t, q^\text{I}) \psi^\text{II}(t, q^\text{II}) + \phi(t, q^\text{I}, q^\text{II}),$$

where $\phi$ solves Schrödinger equation and, $\phi(t, q^\text{I}, Q^\text{II}(t)) = 0$ for all $t$ and $q^\text{I}$. Then, again, the conditional wavefunction of subsystem (I) is (up to an irrelevant scalar factor) equal to $\psi^\text{I}$, and if the Hamiltonian does not contain an interaction term between subsystems (I) and (II), then $\psi^\text{I}$ satisfies a Schrödinger equation.

The fact that the conditional wavefunction of a subsystem does not always evolve by the Schrödinger equation is related to the fact that the usual collapse rule of standard quantum theory emerges from the Bohmian formalism when one considers conditional wavefunctions of subsystems.

== Extensions ==
=== Relativity ===
Pilot wave theory is explicitly nonlocal, which is in ostensible conflict with special relativity. Various extensions of "Bohm-like" mechanics exist that attempt to resolve this problem. Bohm himself in 1953 presented an extension of the theory satisfying the Dirac equation for a single particle. However, this was not extensible to the many-particle case because it used an absolute time.

A renewed interest in constructing Lorentz-invariant extensions of Bohmian theory arose in the 1990s; see Bohm and Hiley: The Undivided Universe and references therein. Another approach is given by Dürr et al., who use Bohm–Dirac models and a Lorentz-invariant foliation of space-time.

Thus, Dürr et al. (1999) showed that it is possible to formally restore Lorentz invariance for the Bohm–Dirac theory by introducing additional structure. This approach still requires a foliation of space-time. While this is in conflict with the standard interpretation of relativity, the preferred foliation, if unobservable, does not lead to any empirical conflicts with relativity. In 2013, Dürr et al. suggested that the required foliation could be covariantly determined by the wavefunction.

The relation between nonlocality and preferred foliation can be better understood as follows. In de Broglie–Bohm theory, nonlocality manifests as the fact that the velocity and acceleration of one particle depends on the instantaneous positions of all other particles. On the other hand, in the theory of relativity the concept of instantaneousness does not have an invariant meaning. Thus, to define particle trajectories, one needs an additional rule that defines which space-time points should be considered instantaneous. The simplest way to achieve this is to introduce a preferred foliation of space-time by hand, such that each hypersurface of the foliation defines a hypersurface of equal time.

Initially, it had been considered impossible to set out a description of photon trajectories in the de Broglie–Bohm theory in view of the difficulties of describing bosons relativistically. In 1996, Partha Ghose presented a relativistic quantum-mechanical description of spin-0 and spin-1 bosons starting from the Duffin–Kemmer–Petiau equation, setting out Bohmian trajectories for massive bosons and for massless bosons (and therefore photons). In 2001, Jean-Pierre Vigier emphasized the importance of deriving a well-defined description of light in terms of particle trajectories in the framework of either the Bohmian mechanics or the Nelson stochastic mechanics. The same year, Ghose worked out Bohmian photon trajectories for specific cases. Subsequent weak-measurement experiments yielded trajectories that coincide with the predicted trajectories. The significance of these experimental findings is controversial.

Chris Dewdney and G. Horton have proposed a relativistically covariant, wave-functional formulation of Bohm's quantum field theory and have extended it to a form that allows the inclusion of gravity.

Roderick I. Sutherland at the University in Sydney has a Lagrangian formalism for the pilot wave and its beables. It draws on Yakir Aharonov's retrocasual weak measurements to explain many-particle entanglement in a special relativistic way without the need for configuration space. The basic idea was already published by Olivier Costa de Beauregard in the 1950s and is also used by John Cramer in his transactional interpretation except the beables that exist between the von Neumann strong projection operator measurements. Sutherland's Lagrangian includes two-way action-reaction between pilot wave and beables. Therefore, it is a post-quantum non-statistical theory with final boundary conditions that violate the no-signal theorems of quantum theory. Just as special relativity is a limiting case of general relativity when the spacetime curvature vanishes, so, too is statistical no-entanglement signaling quantum theory with the Born rule a limiting case of the post-quantum action-reaction Lagrangian when the reaction is set to zero and the final boundary condition is integrated out.

=== Spin ===
To incorporate spin, the wavefunction becomes complex-vector-valued. The value space is called spin space; for a spin-1/2 particle, spin space can be taken to be $\Complex^2$. The guiding equation is modified by taking inner products in spin space to reduce the complex vectors to complex numbers. The Schrödinger equation is modified by adding a Pauli spin term:

$$\begin{align}
\frac{d\mathbf{Q}_k}{dt}(t) &= \frac{\hbar}{m_k} \operatorname{Im}\left(\frac{(\psi,D_k \psi)}{(\psi,\psi)}\right)(\mathbf{Q}_1, \ldots, \mathbf{Q}_N, t), \\
i\hbar\frac{\partial}{\partial t}\psi &= \left(-\sum_{k=1}^{N}\frac{\hbar^2}{2m_k}D_k^2 + V - \sum_{k=1}^{N} \mu_k \frac{\mathbf{S}_k}{\hbar s_k} \cdot \mathbf{B}(\mathbf{q}_k)\right) \psi,
\end{align}$$

where

- $m_k, e_k,\mu_k$ — the mass, charge and magnetic moment of the $k$–th particle
- $\mathbf{S}_k$ — the appropriate spin operator acting in the $k$–th particle's spin space
- $s_k$ — spin quantum number of the $k$–th particle ($s_k = 1/2$ for electron)
- $\mathbf{A}$ is vector potential in $\R^{3}$
- $\mathbf{B}=\nabla\times\mathbf{A}$ is the magnetic field in $\R^{3}$
- $D_k = \nabla_k - \frac{ie_k}{\hbar}\mathbf{A}(\mathbf{q}_k)$ is the covariant derivative, involving the vector potential, ascribed to the coordinates of $k$–th particle (in SI units)
- $\psi$ — the wavefunction defined on the multidimensional configuration space; e.g. a system consisting of two spin-1/2 particles and one spin-1 particle has a wavefunction of the form
  $$\psi: \R^9 \times \R \to \Complex^2 \otimes \Complex^2 \otimes \Complex^3,$$
  where $\otimes$ is a tensor product, so this spin space is 12-dimensional
- $(\cdot,\cdot)$ is the inner product in spin space $\Complex^d$:
  $$(\phi, \psi) = \sum_{s=1}^d \phi_s^* \psi_s.$$

=== Quantum field theory ===
In Dürr et al., the authors describe an extension of de Broglie–Bohm theory for handling creation and annihilation operators, which they refer to as "Bell-type quantum field theories". The basic idea is that configuration space becomes the (disjoint) space of all possible configurations of any number of particles. For part of the time, the system evolves deterministically under the guiding equation with a fixed number of particles. But under a stochastic process, particles may be created and annihilated. The distribution of creation events is dictated by the wavefunction. The wavefunction itself is evolving at all times over the full multi-particle configuration space.

Hrvoje Nikolić introduces a purely deterministic de Broglie–Bohm theory of particle creation and destruction, according to which particle trajectories are continuous, but particle detectors behave as if particles have been created or destroyed even when a true creation or destruction of particles does not take place.

=== Curved space ===
To extend de Broglie–Bohm theory to curved space (Riemannian manifolds in mathematical parlance), one simply notes that all of the elements of these equations make sense, such as gradients and Laplacians. Thus, we use equations that have the same form as above. Topological and boundary conditions may apply in supplementing the evolution of the Schrödinger equation.

For a de Broglie–Bohm theory on curved space with spin, the spin space becomes a vector bundle over configuration space, and the potential in the Schrödinger equation becomes a local self-adjoint operator acting on that space. The field equations for the de Broglie–Bohm theory in the relativistic case with spin can also be given for curved space-times with torsion.

In a general spacetime with curvature and torsion, the guiding equation for the four-velocity $u^i$ of an elementary fermion particle is
$$u^i=\frac{e^i_\mu \bar{\psi}\gamma^\mu \psi}{\bar{\psi}\psi},$$
where the wave function $\psi$ is a spinor, $\bar{\psi}$ is the corresponding adjoint, $\gamma^\mu$ are the Dirac matrices, and $e^i_\mu$ is a tetrad. If the wave function propagates according to the curved Dirac equation, then the particle moves according to the Mathisson-Papapetrou equations of motion, which are an extension of the geodesic equation. This relativistic wave-particle duality follows from the conservation laws for the spin tensor and energy-momentum tensor, and also from the covariant Heisenberg picture equation of motion.

=== Exploiting nonlocality ===
Diagram made by Antony Valentini in a lecture about the De Broglie–Bohm theory. Valentini argues quantum theory is a special equilibrium case of a wider physics and that it may be possible to observe and exploit quantum non-equilibrium

De Broglie and Bohm's causal interpretation of quantum mechanics was later extended by Bohm, Vigier, Hiley, Valentini and others to include stochastic properties. Bohm and other physicists, including Valentini, view the Born rule linking $R$ to the probability density function $\rho = R^2$ as representing not a basic law, but a result of a system having reached quantum equilibrium during the course of the time development under the Schrödinger equation. It can be shown that, once an equilibrium has been reached, the system remains in such equilibrium over the course of its further evolution: this follows from the continuity equation associated with the Schrödinger evolution of $\psi$. It is less straightforward to demonstrate whether and how such an equilibrium is reached in the first place.

Antony Valentini has extended de Broglie–Bohm theory to include signal nonlocality that would allow entanglement to be used as a stand-alone communication channel without a secondary classical "key" signal to "unlock" the message encoded in the entanglement. This violates orthodox quantum theory but has the virtue of making the parallel universes of the chaotic inflation theory observable in principle.

Unlike de Broglie–Bohm theory, Valentini's theory the wavefunction evolution also depends on the ontological variables. This introduces an instability, a feedback loop that pushes the hidden variables out of "sub-quantal heat death". The resulting theory becomes nonlinear and non-unitary. Valentini argues that the laws of quantum mechanics are emergent and form a "quantum equilibrium" that is analogous to thermal equilibrium in classical dynamics, such that other "quantum non-equilibrium" distributions may in principle be observed and exploited, for which the statistical predictions of quantum theory are violated. It is controversially argued that quantum theory is merely a special case of a much wider nonlinear physics, a physics in which nonlocal (superluminal) signalling is possible, and in which the uncertainty principle can be violated.

=== Three wave hypothesis ===
More complex variants of this type of approach have appeared, for instance the three wave hypothesis of Ryszard Horodecki as well as other complicated combinations of de Broglie and Compton waves. To date there is no evidence that these are useful.

== Results ==
Below are some highlights of the results that arise out of an analysis of de Broglie–Bohm theory. Experimental results agree with all of quantum mechanics' standard predictions insofar as it has them. But while standard quantum mechanics is limited to discussing the results of "measurements", de Broglie–Bohm theory governs the dynamics of a system without the intervention of outside observers (p. 117 in Bell).

The basis for agreement with standard quantum mechanics is that the particles are distributed according to $|\psi|^2$. This is a statement of observer ignorance: the initial positions are represented by a statistical distribution so deterministic trajectories will result in a statistical distribution.

=== Measuring spin and polarization ===
According to ordinary quantum theory, it is not possible to measure the spin or polarization of a particle directly; instead, the component in one direction is measured; the outcome from a single particle may be 1, meaning that the particle is aligned with the measuring apparatus, or −1, meaning that it is aligned the opposite way. An ensemble of particles prepared by a polarizer to be in state 1 will all measure polarized in state 1 in a subsequent apparatus. A polarized ensemble sent through a polarizer set at angle to the first pass will result in some values of 1 and some of −1 with a probability that depends on the relative alignment. For a full explanation of this, see the Stern–Gerlach experiment.

In de Broglie–Bohm theory, the results of a spin experiment cannot be analyzed without some knowledge of the experimental setup. It is possible to modify the setup so that the trajectory of the particle is unaffected, but that the particle with one setup registers as spin-up, while in the other setup it registers as spin-down. Thus, for the de Broglie–Bohm theory, the particle's spin is not an intrinsic property of the particle; instead spin is, so to speak, in the wavefunction of the particle in relation to the particular device being used to measure the spin. This is an illustration of what is sometimes referred to as contextuality and is related to naive realism about operators. Interpretationally, measurement results are a deterministic property of the system and its environment, which includes information about the experimental setup including the context of co-measured observables; in no sense does the system itself possess the property being measured, as would have been the case in classical physics.

=== Measurements, the quantum formalism, and observer independence ===
De Broglie–Bohm theory gives almost the same results as (non-relativisitic) quantum mechanics. It treats the wavefunction as a fundamental object in the theory, as the wavefunction describes how the particles move. This means that no experiment can distinguish between the two theories. This section outlines the ideas as to how the standard quantum formalism arises out of quantum mechanics.

==== Collapse of the wavefunction ====
De Broglie–Bohm theory is a theory that applies primarily to the whole universe. That is, there is a single wavefunction governing the motion of all of the particles in the universe according to the guiding equation. Theoretically, the motion of one particle depends on the positions of all of the other particles in the universe. In some situations, such as in experimental systems, we can represent the system itself in terms of a de Broglie–Bohm theory in which the wavefunction of the system is obtained by conditioning on the environment of the system. Thus, the system can be analyzed with the Schrödinger equation and the guiding equation, with an initial $|\psi|^2$ distribution for the particles in the system (see the section on the conditional wavefunction of a subsystem for details).

It requires a special setup for the conditional wavefunction of a system to obey a quantum evolution. When a system interacts with its environment, such as through a measurement, the conditional wavefunction of the system evolves in a different way. The evolution of the universal wavefunction can become such that the wavefunction of the system appears to be in a superposition of distinct states. But if the environment has recorded the results of the experiment, then using the actual Bohmian configuration of the environment to condition on, the conditional wavefunction collapses to just one alternative, the one corresponding with the measurement results.

Collapse of the universal wavefunction never occurs in de Broglie–Bohm theory. Its entire evolution is governed by the Schrödinger equation, and the particles' evolutions are governed by the guiding equation. Collapse only occurs in a phenomenological way for systems that seem to follow their own Schrödinger equation. As this is an effective description of the system, it is a matter of choice as to what to define the experimental system to include, and this will affect when "collapse" occurs.

==== Operators as observables ====
In the standard quantum formalism, measuring observables is generally thought of as measuring operators on the Hilbert space. For example, measuring position is considered to be a measurement of the position operator. This relationship between physical measurements and Hilbert space operators is, for standard quantum mechanics, an additional axiom of the theory. The de Broglie–Bohm theory, by contrast, requires no such measurement axioms (and measurement as such is not a dynamically distinct or special sub-category of physical processes in the theory). In particular, the usual operators-as-observables formalism is, for de Broglie–Bohm theory, a theorem. A major point of the analysis is that many of the measurements of the observables do not correspond to properties of the particles; they are (as in the case of spin discussed above) measurements of the wavefunction.

In the history of de Broglie–Bohm theory, the proponents have often had to deal with claims that this theory is impossible. Such arguments are generally based on inappropriate analysis of operators as observables. If one believes that spin measurements are indeed measuring the spin of a particle that existed prior to the measurement, then one does reach contradictions. De Broglie–Bohm theory deals with this by noting that spin is not a feature of the particle, but rather that of the wavefunction. As such, it only has a definite outcome once the experimental apparatus is chosen. Once that is taken into account, the impossibility theorems become irrelevant. There are also objections to this theory based on what it says about particular situations usually involving eigenstates of an operator. For example, the ground state of hydrogen is a real wavefunction. According to the guiding equation, this means that the electron is at rest when in this state. Nevertheless, it is distributed according to $|\psi|^2$, and no contradiction to experimental results is possible to detect.

Operators as observables leads many to believe that many operators are equivalent. De Broglie–Bohm theory, from this perspective, chooses the position observable as a favored observable rather than, say, the momentum observable. Again, the link to the position observable is a consequence of the dynamics. The motivation for de Broglie–Bohm theory is to describe a system of particles. This implies that the goal of the theory is to describe the positions of those particles at all times. Other observables do not have this compelling ontological status. Having definite positions explains having definite results such as flashes on a detector screen. Other observables would not lead to that conclusion, but there need not be any problem in defining a mathematical theory for other observables; see Hyman et al. for an exploration of the fact that a probability density and probability current can be defined for any set of commuting operators.

==== Hidden variables ====
De Broglie–Bohm theory is often referred to as a "hidden-variable" theory. Bohm used this description in his original papers on the subject, writing: "From the point of view of the usual interpretation, these additional elements or parameters [permitting a detailed causal and continuous description of all processes] could be called 'hidden' variables." Bohm and Hiley later stated that they found Bohm's choice of the term "hidden variables" to be too restrictive. In particular, they argued that a particle is not actually hidden but rather "is what is most directly manifested in an observation [though] its properties cannot be observed with arbitrary precision (within the limits set by uncertainty principle)". However, others nevertheless treat the term "hidden variable" as a suitable description.

Generalized particle trajectories can be extrapolated from numerous weak measurements on an ensemble of equally prepared systems, and such trajectories coincide with the de Broglie–Bohm trajectories. In particular, an experiment with two entangled photons, in which a set of Bohmian trajectories for one of the photons was determined using weak measurements and postselection, can be understood in terms of a nonlocal connection between that photon's trajectory and the other photon's polarization. However, not only the De Broglie–Bohm interpretation, but also many other interpretations of quantum mechanics that do not include such trajectories are consistent with such experimental evidence.

=== Different predictions ===
A specialized version of the double slit experiment has been devised to test characteristics of the trajectory predictions. Results from one such experiment agreed with the predictions of standard quantum mechanics and disagreed with the Bohm predictions when they conflicted. These conclusions have been the subject of debate.

=== Heisenberg's uncertainty principle ===
The Heisenberg's uncertainty principle states that when two complementary measurements of certain pairs (Note: Specifically, observables for which their corresponding operators do not commute.) of observables are made, there is a limit to the product of their accuracy. As an example, if one measures the position with an accuracy of $\Delta x$ and the momentum with an accuracy of $\Delta p$, then $\Delta x \Delta p \geq \hbar/2.$

In de Broglie–Bohm theory, there is always a matter of fact about the position and momentum of a particle. Each particle has a well-defined trajectory, as well as a wavefunction. Observers have limited knowledge as to what this trajectory is (and thus of the position and momentum). It is the lack of knowledge of the particle's trajectory that accounts for the uncertainty relation. What one can know about a particle at any given time is described by the wavefunction. Since the uncertainty relation can be derived from the wavefunction in other interpretations of quantum mechanics, it can be likewise derived (in the epistemic sense mentioned above) on the de Broglie–Bohm theory.

To put the statement differently, the particles' positions are only known statistically. As in classical mechanics, successive observations of the particles' positions refine the experimenter's knowledge of the particles' initial conditions. Thus, with succeeding observations, the initial conditions become more and more restricted. This formalism is consistent with the normal use of the Schrödinger equation.

For the derivation of the uncertainty relation, see Heisenberg uncertainty principle, noting that this article describes the principle from the viewpoint of the Copenhagen interpretation.

=== Quantum entanglement, Einstein–Podolsky–Rosen paradox, Bell's theorem, and nonlocality ===
De Broglie–Bohm theory highlighted the issue of nonlocality: it inspired John Stewart Bell to prove his now-famous theorem, which in turn led to the Bell tests.

In the Einstein–Podolsky–Rosen paradox, the authors describe a thought experiment that one could perform on a pair of particles that have interacted, the results of which they interpreted as indicating that quantum mechanics is an incomplete theory.

Decades later John Bell proved Bell's theorem (see p. 14 in Bell), in which he showed that, if they are to agree with the empirical predictions of quantum mechanics, all such "hidden-variable" completions of quantum mechanics must either be nonlocal (as the Bohm interpretation is) or give up the assumption that experiments produce unique results (see counterfactual definiteness and many-worlds interpretation). In particular, Bell proved that any local theory with unique results must make empirical predictions satisfying a statistical constraint called "Bell's inequality".

Alain Aspect performed a series of tests of Bell's inequality using polarization-entangled photons. Aspect's results show experimentally that Bell's inequality is in fact violated, meaning that the relevant quantum-mechanical predictions are correct. In these Bell tests, entangled pairs of particles are created; the particles are then separated, traveling to remote measuring devices. The orientation of the measuring devices can be changed while the particles are in flight, demonstrating the apparent nonlocality of the effect.

The de Broglie–Bohm theory makes the same empirically verified predictions for the Bell tests as ordinary quantum mechanics. The de Broglie–Bohm theory is non relativistic and manifestly nonlocal. It is often criticized or rejected based on this; Bell's attitude was: "It is a merit of the de Broglie–Bohm version to bring this [nonlocality] out so explicitly that it cannot be ignored."

The de Broglie–Bohm theory describes the physics in the Bell tests as follows: to understand the evolution of the particles, we need to set up a wave equation for both particles; the orientation of the apparatus affects the wavefunction. The particles in the experiment follow the guidance of the wavefunction. It is the wavefunction that carries the faster-than-light effect of changing the orientation of the apparatus. Maudlin provides an analysis of exactly what kind of nonlocality is present and how it is compatible with relativity. Bell has shown that the nonlocality does not allow superluminal communication.

=== Classical limit ===
Bohm's formulation of de Broglie–Bohm theory in a classical-looking version has the merits that the emergence of classical behavior seems to follow immediately for any situation in which the quantum potential is negligible, as noted by Bohm in 1952. Modern methods of decoherence are relevant to an analysis of this limit. See Allori et al. for steps towards a rigorous analysis.

=== Quantum trajectory method ===
Work by Robert E. Wyatt in the early 2000s attempted to use the Bohm "particles" as an adaptive mesh that follows the actual trajectory of a quantum state in time and space. In the "quantum trajectory" method, one samples the quantum wavefunction with a mesh of quadrature points. One then evolves the quadrature points in time according to the Bohm equations of motion. At each time step, one then re-synthesizes the wavefunction from the points, recomputes the quantum forces, and continues the calculation. This approach has been adapted, extended, and used by a number of researchers in the chemical physics community as a way to compute semi-classical and quasi-classical molecular dynamics. A 2007 issue of The Journal of Physical Chemistry A was dedicated to Prof. Wyatt and his work on "computational Bohmian dynamics".

Eric R. Bittner's group at the University of Houston has advanced a statistical variant of this approach that uses Bayesian sampling technique to sample the quantum density and compute the quantum potential on a structureless mesh of points. This technique was recently used to estimate quantum effects in the heat capacity of small clusters Ne_{n} for n ≈ 100.

There remain difficulties using the Bohmian approach, mostly associated with the formation of singularities in the quantum potential due to nodes in the quantum wavefunction. In general, nodes forming due to interference effects lead to the case where $R^{-1}\nabla^2R \to \infty.$ This results in an infinite force on the sample particles forcing them to move away from the node and often crossing the path of other sample points (which violates single-valuedness). Various schemes have been developed to overcome this; however, no general solution has yet emerged.

These methods, as does Bohm's Hamilton–Jacobi formulation, do not apply to situations in which the full dynamics of spin need to be taken into account.

The properties of trajectories in the de Broglie–Bohm theory differ significantly from the Moyal quantum trajectories as well as the quantum trajectories from the unraveling of an open quantum system.

== Similarities with the many-worlds interpretation ==
Kim Joris Boström has proposed a non-relativistic quantum mechanical theory that combines elements of de Broglie-Bohm mechanics and Everett's many-worlds. In particular, the unreal many-worlds interpretation of Hawking and Weinberg is similar to the Bohmian concept of unreal empty branch worlds:

The second issue with Bohmian mechanics may, at first sight, appear rather harmless, but which on a closer look develops considerable destructive power: the issue of empty branches. These are the components of the post-measurement state that do not guide any particles because they do not have the actual configuration q in their support. At first sight, the empty branches do not appear problematic but on the contrary very helpful as they enable the theory to explain unique outcomes of measurements. Also, they seem to explain why there is an effective "collapse of the wavefunction", as in ordinary quantum mechanics. On a closer view, though, one must admit that these empty branches do not actually disappear. As the wavefunction is taken to describe a really existing field, all their branches really exist and will evolve forever by the Schrödinger dynamics, no matter how many of them will become empty in the course of the evolution. Every branch of the global wavefunction potentially describes a complete world which is, according to Bohm's ontology, only a possible world that would be the actual world if only it were filled with particles, and which is in every respect identical to a corresponding world in Everett's theory. Only one branch at a time is occupied by particles, thereby representing the actual world, while all other branches, though really existing as part of a really existing wavefunction, are empty and thus contain some sort of "zombie worlds" with planets, oceans, trees, cities, cars and people who talk like us and behave like us, but who do not actually exist. Now, if the Everettian theory may be accused of ontological extravagance, then Bohmian mechanics could be accused of ontological wastefulness. On top of the ontology of empty branches comes the additional ontology of particle positions that are, on account of the quantum equilibrium hypothesis, forever unknown to the observer. Yet, the actual configuration is never needed for the calculation of the statistical predictions in experimental reality, for these can be obtained by mere wavefunction algebra. From this perspective, Bohmian mechanics may appear as a wasteful and redundant theory. I think it is considerations like these that are the biggest obstacle in the way of a general acceptance of Bohmian mechanics.

Many authors have expressed critical views of de Broglie–Bohm theory by comparing it to Everett's many-worlds approach. Many (but not all) proponents of de Broglie–Bohm theory (such as Bohm and Bell) interpret the universal wavefunction as physically real. According to some supporters of Everett's theory, if the (never collapsing) wavefunction is taken to be physically real, then it is natural to interpret the theory as having the same many worlds as Everett's theory. In the Everettian view the role of the Bohmian particle is to act as a "pointer", tagging, or selecting, just one branch of the universal wavefunction (the assumption that this branch indicates which wave packet determines the observed result of a given experiment is called the "result assumption"); the other branches are designated "empty" and implicitly assumed by Bohm to be devoid of conscious observers. H. Dieter Zeh comments on these "empty" branches:

It is usually overlooked that Bohm's theory contains the same "many worlds" of dynamically separate branches as the Everett interpretation (now regarded as "empty" wave components), since it is based on precisely the same ... global wave function ...

David Deutsch has expressed the same point more "acerbically":

Pilot-wave theories are parallel-universe theories in a state of chronic denial.

This conclusion has been challenged by Detlef Dürr and Justin Lazarovici:

The Bohmian, of course, cannot accept this argument. For her, it is decidedly the particle configuration in three-dimensional space and not the wave function on the abstract configuration space that constitutes a world (or rather, the world). Instead, she will accuse the Everettian of not having local beables (in Bell's sense) in her theory, that is, the ontological variables that refer to localized entities in three-dimensional space or four-dimensional spacetime. The many worlds of her theory thus merely appear as a grotesque consequence of this omission.

== Criticism based on Occam's razor ==
Many authors, including Nobel laureates Werner Heisenberg, Sir Anthony Leggett, and Sir Roger Penrose have criticized it for not adding anything new.

Both Hugh Everett III and Bohm treated the wavefunction as a physically real field. Everett's many-worlds interpretation is an attempt to demonstrate that the wavefunction alone is sufficient to account for all our observations. When we see the particle detectors flash or hear the click of a Geiger counter, Everett's theory interprets this as our wavefunction responding to changes in the detector's wavefunction, which is responding in turn to the passage of another wavefunction (which we think of as a "particle", but is actually just another wave packet). No particle (in the Bohm sense of having a defined position and velocity) exists according to that theory. For this reason Everett sometimes referred to his own many-worlds approach as the "pure wave theory". Of Bohm's 1952 approach, Everett said:

Our main criticism of this view is on the grounds of simplicity – if one desires to hold the view that $\psi$ is a real field, then the associated particle is superfluous, since, as we have endeavored to illustrate, the pure wave theory is itself satisfactory.

In the Everettian view, then, the Bohm particles are superfluous entities, similar to, and equally as unnecessary as, for example, the luminiferous ether, which was found to be unnecessary in special relativity. This argument is sometimes called the "redundancy argument", since the superfluous particles are redundant in the sense of Occam's razor.

According to Brown & Wallace, the de Broglie–Bohm particles play no role in the solution of the measurement problem. For these authors, the "result assumption" (see above) is inconsistent with the view that there is no measurement problem in the predictable outcome (i.e. single-outcome) case. They also say that a standard tacit assumption of de Broglie–Bohm theory (that an observer becomes aware of configurations of particles of ordinary objects by means of correlations between such configurations and the configuration of the particles in the observer's brain) is unreasonable. This conclusion has been challenged by Valentini, who argues that the entirety of such objections arises from a failure to interpret de Broglie–Bohm theory on its own terms. According to Peter R. Holland, in a wider Hamiltonian framework, theories can be formulated in which particles do act back on the wave function.

== Derivations ==
De Broglie–Bohm theory has been derived many times and in many ways. Below are six derivations, all of which are very different and lead to different ways of understanding and extending this theory.

- The Schrödinger equation can be derived by using Einstein's light quanta hypothesis: $E = \hbar \omega$ and de Broglie's hypothesis: $\mathbf{p} = \hbar \mathbf{k}$.

The guiding equation can be derived in a similar fashion. We assume a plane wave: $\psi(\mathbf{x}, t) = A e^{i(\mathbf{k}\cdot\mathbf{x} - \omega t)}$. Notice that $i\mathbf{k} = \nabla\psi/\psi$. Assuming that $\mathbf{p} = m \mathbf{v}$ for the particle's actual velocity, we have that $\mathbf{v} = \frac{\hbar}{m} \operatorname{Im}\left(\frac{\nabla\psi}{\psi}\right)$. Thus, we have the guiding equation.
Notice that this derivation does not use the Schrödinger equation.

- Preserving the density under the time evolution is another method of derivation. This is the method that Bell cites. It is this method that generalizes to many possible alternative theories. The starting point is the continuity equation $-\frac{\partial\rho}{\partial t} = \nabla \cdot (\rho v^\psi)$ for the density $\rho =|\psi|^2$. This equation describes a probability flow along a current. We take the velocity field associated with this current as the velocity field whose integral curves yield the motion of the particle.
- A method applicable for particles without spin is to do a polar decomposition of the wavefunction and transform the Schrödinger equation into two coupled equations: the continuity equation from above and the Hamilton–Jacobi equation. This is the method used by Bohm in 1952. The decomposition and equations are as follows:

Decomposition: $\psi(\mathbf{x}, t) = R(\mathbf{x}, t) e^{i S(\mathbf{x}, t) / \hbar}.$ Note that $R^2(\mathbf{x}, t)$ corresponds to the probability density $\rho(\mathbf{x}, t) =|\psi(\mathbf{x}, t)|^2$.
Continuity equation: $-\frac{\partial\rho(\mathbf{x}, t)}{\partial t} = \nabla \cdot \left(\rho(\mathbf{x}, t) \frac{\nabla S(\mathbf{x}, t)}{m}\right)$.
Hamilton–Jacobi equation: $\frac{\partial S(\mathbf{x}, t)}{\partial t} = -\left[\frac{1}{2m}(\nabla S(\mathbf{x}, t))^2 + V - \frac{\hbar ^2}{2m} \frac{\nabla^2R(\mathbf{x}, t)}{R(\mathbf{x}, t)}\right].$
The Hamilton–Jacobi equation is the equation derived from a Newtonian system with potential $V - \frac{\hbar^2}{2m} \frac{\nabla^2 R}{R}$ and velocity field $\frac{\nabla S}{m}.$ The potential $V$ is the classical potential that appears in the Schrödinger equation, and the other term involving $R$ is the quantum potential, terminology introduced by Bohm.
This leads to viewing the quantum theory as particles moving under the classical force modified by a quantum force. However, unlike standard Newtonian mechanics, the initial velocity field is already specified by $\frac{\nabla S}{m}$, which is a symptom of this being a first-order theory, not a second-order theory.

- A fourth derivation was given by Dürr et al. In their derivation, they derive the velocity field by demanding the appropriate transformation properties given by the various symmetries that the Schrödinger equation satisfies, once the wavefunction is suitably transformed. The guiding equation is what emerges from that analysis.
- A fifth derivation, given by Dürr et al. is appropriate for generalization to quantum field theory and the Dirac equation. The idea is that a velocity field can also be understood as a first-order differential operator acting on functions. Thus, if we know how it acts on functions, we know what it is. Then given the Hamiltonian operator $H$, the equation to satisfy for all functions $f$ (with associated multiplication operator $\hat{f}$) is $(v(f))(q) = \operatorname{Re}\frac{\left(\psi, \frac{i}{\hbar} [H, \hat f] \psi\right)}{(\psi, \psi)}(q)$, where $(v, w)$ is the local Hermitian inner product on the value space of the wavefunction.

This formulation allows for stochastic theories such as the creation and annihilation of particles.

- A further derivation has been given by Peter R. Holland, on which he bases his quantum-physics textbook The Quantum Theory of Motion. It is based on three basic postulates and an additional fourth postulate that links the wavefunction to measurement probabilities:
  1. A physical system consists in a spatiotemporally propagating wave and a point particle guided by it.
  2. The wave is described mathematically by a solution $\psi$ to the Schrödinger wave equation.
  3. The particle motion is described by a solution to $\mathbf{\dot x}(t) = [\nabla S (\mathbf{x}(t), t))]/m$ in dependence on initial condition $\mathbf{x}(t = 0)$, with $S$ the phase of $\psi$.
    The fourth postulate is:
  4. The probability $\rho(\mathbf{x}(t))$ to find the particle in the differential volume $d^3 x$ at time t equals $|\psi(\mathbf{x}(t))|^2$.

== History ==
De Broglie's pilot wave theory, as he would later call it, was first explored in his famous 1924 PhD thesis introducing the concept of matter waves. De Broglie introduced a "phase wave" for each particle as a new basis for particle dynamics. Drawing on the optical-mechanical analogy, particle velocities were to follow trajectories perpendicular to surfaces of equal phase in the guiding wave. The particle velocity is equal to the group velocity of his phase wave and the velocities derived from the gradient of the wave front rather than having accelerations derived from forces.

De Broglie's PhD thesis was based in a merger of variational principles from optics and mechanics. From optics de Broglie takes Fermat's principle, written as a condition of stationary phase between points a and b:
$$\delta \int_a^b d\phi = 0.$$
The phase change can be written in terms of an incremental distance along the path, dl, as
$$d\phi = \frac{2\pi \nu dl}{v_\textrm{ph}}$$
for wave of frequency $\nu$ and phase velocity $v_\textrm{ph} = c^2/v.$ Using the Planck relation, mass-energy equivalence, $h\nu = E = mc^2$, de Broglie can write the phase change in terms of particle momentum along the path:
$$d\phi = \frac{2\pi}{h} mv \ dl.$$
In this way de Broglie comes to Maupertuis' principle of mechanics for a particle,
$$\delta \int_a^b m\mathbf{v}\cdot d\mathbf{x}= 0.$$
De Broglie concludes

Fermat's principle applied to the phase wave is identical to Maupertuis' principle applied to the moving body; the dynamically possible trajectories of the moving body are identical to the possible rays of the wave.

While de Broglie's thesis was, by his acknowledgement abstract and incomplete, it had wide impact. Einstein's comments was "He has lifted a corner of the great veil."

=== 1927 pilot wave theory ===
Pilot-wave theory first appeared in de Broglie's 1927 paper Wave mechanics and the atomic structure of matter and of radiation. The bulk of the paper describes particles as singularities of waves in 3 dimensional space with the motion of the particles determined by another, continuous, wave matching the one in Schrodinger's quantum theory. Based on the unification of Maupertuis and Fermat principles, the particle velocities obey first-order dynamics given by the phase of the continuous wave, $m_i\mathbf{v}_i=\nabla_i\phi.$ He ends the paper by pointing out that the singularity aspect is independent of the pilot wave mechanics.

De Broglie presented his pilot wave theory at the 1927 Solvay Conference, omitting the singularities aspect by simply postulating the pilot wave. At the end of the presentation, Wolfgang Pauli pointed out that it was not compatible with a semi-classical technique Fermi had previously adopted in the case of inelastic scattering. Contrary to a popular legend, de Broglie actually gave the correct rebuttal that the particular technique could not be generalized for Pauli's purpose, although the audience might have been lost in the technical details and de Broglie's mild manner left the impression that Pauli's objection was valid. He was eventually persuaded to abandon this theory nonetheless because he was "discouraged by criticisms which [it] roused". De Broglie's theory already applies to multiple spin-less particles, but lacks an adequate theory of measurement as no one understood quantum decoherence at the time.

Peter R. Holland has pointed out that, earlier in 1927, Einstein had actually submitted a preprint with a similar proposal but, not convinced, had withdrawn it before publication. According to Holland, failure to appreciate key points of the de Broglie–Bohm theory has led to confusion, the key point being "that the trajectories of a many-body quantum system are correlated not because the particles exert a direct force on one another (à la Coulomb) but because all are acted upon by an entity – mathematically described by the wavefunction or functions of it – that lies beyond them". This entity is the quantum potential.

=== Bohm's proposal ===
David Bohm, dissatisfied with the prevailing orthodoxy, rediscovered de Broglie's pilot wave theory in 1952. Bohm's suggestions were not then widely received, partly due to reasons unrelated to their content, such as Bohm's youthful communist affiliations. The de Broglie–Bohm theory was widely deemed unacceptable by mainstream theorists, mostly because of its explicit nonlocality. On the theory, John Stewart Bell, author of the 1964 Bell's theorem wrote in 1982:

Bohm showed explicitly how parameters could indeed be introduced, into nonrelativistic wave mechanics, with the help of which the indeterministic description could be transformed into a deterministic one. More importantly, in my opinion, the subjectivity of the orthodox version, the necessary reference to the "observer", could be eliminated. ...

But why then had Born not told me of this "pilot wave"? If only to point out what was wrong with it? Why did von Neumann not consider it? More extraordinarily, why did people go on producing "impossibility" proofs, after 1952, and as recently as 1978?... Why is the pilot wave picture ignored in text books? Should it not be taught, not as the only way, but as an antidote to the prevailing complacency? To show us that vagueness, subjectivity, and indeterminism, are not forced on us by experimental facts, but by deliberate theoretical choice?

Since the 1990s, there has been renewed interest in formulating extensions to de Broglie–Bohm theory, attempting to reconcile it with special relativity and quantum field theory, besides other features such as spin or curved spatial geometries.

After publishing his popular textbook Quantum Theory that adhered entirely to the Copenhagen orthodoxy, Bohm was persuaded by Einstein to take a critical look at von Neumann's no hidden variables proof. The result was 'A Suggested Interpretation of the Quantum Theory in Terms of "Hidden Variables" I and II' [Bohm 1952]. It was an independent origination of the pilot wave theory, and extended it to incorporate a consistent theory of measurement, and to address a criticism of Pauli that de Broglie did not properly respond to; it is taken to be deterministic (though Bohm hinted in the original papers that there should be disturbances to this, in the way Brownian motion disturbs Newtonian mechanics). This stage is known as the de Broglie–Bohm Theory in Bell's work [Bell 1987] and is the basis for 'The Quantum Theory of Motion' [Holland 1993].

This stage applies to multiple particles, and is deterministic.

The de Broglie–Bohm theory is an example of a hidden-variables theory. Bohm originally hoped that hidden variables could provide a local, causal, objective description that would resolve or eliminate many of the paradoxes of quantum mechanics, such as Schrödinger's cat, the measurement problem and the collapse of the wavefunction. However, Bell's theorem complicates this hope, as it demonstrates that there can be no local hidden-variable theory that is compatible with the predictions of quantum mechanics. The Bohmian interpretation is causal but not local.

Bohm's paper was largely ignored or panned by other physicists. Albert Einstein, who had suggested that Bohm search for a realist alternative to the prevailing Copenhagen approach, did not consider Bohm's interpretation to be a satisfactory answer to the quantum nonlocality question, calling it "too cheap", while Werner Heisenberg considered it a "superfluous 'ideological superstructure' ". Wolfgang Pauli, who had been unconvinced by de Broglie in 1927, conceded to Bohm as follows:

I just received your long letter of 20th November, and I also have studied more thoroughly the details of your paper. I do not see any longer the possibility of any logical contradiction as long as your results agree completely with those of the usual wave mechanics and as long as no means is given to measure the values of your hidden parameters both in the measuring apparatus and in the observe [sic] system. As far as the whole matter stands now, your 'extra wave-mechanical predictions' are still a check, which cannot be cashed.

He subsequently described Bohm's theory as "artificial metaphysics".

According to physicist Max Dresden, when Bohm's theory was presented at the Institute for Advanced Study in Princeton, many of the objections were ad hominem, focusing on Bohm's sympathy with communists as exemplified by his refusal to give testimony to the House Un-American Activities Committee.

In 1979, Chris Philippidis, Chris Dewdney and Basil Hiley were the first to perform numeric computations on the basis of the quantum potential to deduce ensembles of particle trajectories. Their work renewed the interests of physicists in the Bohm interpretation of quantum physics.

Eventually John Bell began to defend the theory. In "Speakable and Unspeakable in Quantum Mechanics" [Bell 1987], several of the papers refer to hidden-variables theories (which include Bohm's).

The trajectories of the Bohm model that would result for particular experimental arrangements were termed "surreal" by some. Still in 2016, mathematical physicist Sheldon Goldstein said of Bohm's theory: "There was a time when you couldn't even talk about it because it was heretical. It probably still is the kiss of death for a physics career to be actually working on Bohm, but maybe that's changing".

=== Bohmian mechanics ===
Bohmian mechanics is the same theory, but with an emphasis on the notion of current flow, which is determined on the basis of the quantum equilibrium hypothesis that the probability follows the Born rule. The term "Bohmian mechanics" is also often used to include most of the further extensions past the spin-less version of Bohm. While de Broglie–Bohm theory has Lagrangians and Hamilton-Jacobi equations as a primary focus and backdrop, with the icon of the quantum potential, Bohmian mechanics considers the continuity equation as primary and has the guiding equation as its icon. They are mathematically equivalent in so far as the Hamilton-Jacobi formulation applies, i.e., spin-less particles.

All of non-relativistic quantum mechanics can be fully accounted for in this theory. Recent studies have used this formalism to compute the evolution of many-body quantum systems, with a considerable increase in speed as compared to other quantum-based methods.

=== Causal interpretation and ontological interpretation ===
Bohm developed his original ideas, calling them the Causal Interpretation. Later he felt that causal sounded too much like deterministic and preferred to call his theory the Ontological Interpretation. The main reference is "The Undivided Universe" (Bohm, Hiley 1993).

This stage covers work by Bohm and in collaboration with Jean-Pierre Vigier and Basil Hiley. Bohm is clear that this theory is non-deterministic (the work with Hiley includes a stochastic theory). As such, this theory is not strictly speaking a formulation of de Broglie–Bohm theory, but it deserves mention here because the term "Bohm Interpretation" is ambiguous between this theory and de Broglie–Bohm theory.

In 1996 philosopher of science Arthur Fine gave an in-depth analysis of possible interpretations of Bohm's model of 1952.

William Simpson has suggested a hylomorphic interpretation of Bohmian mechanics, in which the cosmos is an Aristotelian substance composed of material particles and a substantial form. The wave function is assigned a dispositional role in choreographing the trajectories of the particles.

== Hydrodynamic quantum analogs ==
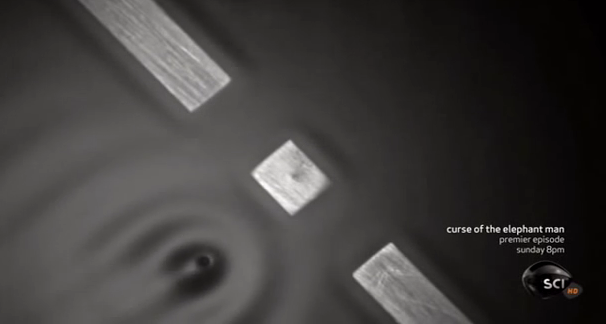
Couder's disputed experiments, purportedly "materializing" the pilot wave model.

Experiments on hydrodynamical analogs of quantum mechanics beginning with the work of Couder and Fort (2006) have purported to show that macroscopic classical pilot-waves can exhibit characteristics previously thought to be restricted to the quantum realm. Hydrodynamic pilot-wave analogs have been claimed to duplicate the double slit experiment, tunneling, quantized orbits, and numerous other quantum phenomena which have led to a resurgence in interest in pilot wave theories. The analogs have been compared to the Faraday wave. These results have been disputed: experiments fail to reproduce aspects of the double-slit experiments. High-precision measurements in the tunneling case point to a different origin of the unpredictable crossing: rather than initial position uncertainty or environmental noise, interactions at the barrier seem to be involved.

Another classical analog has been reported in surface gravity waves.

A comparison by Bush (2015) among the walking droplet system, de Broglie's double-solution pilot-wave theory and its extension to SED
	Hydrodynamic walkers	de Broglie	SED pilot wave
Driving	bath vibration	internal clock	vacuum fluctuations
Spectrum	monochromatic	monochromatic	broad
Trigger	bouncing	zitterbewegung	zitterbewegung
Trigger frequency	$\omega_F$	$\omega_c=mc^2/\hbar$	$\omega_c=mc^2/\hbar$
Energetics	GPE $\leftrightarrow$ wave	$mc^2\leftrightarrow\hbar\omega$	$mc^2\leftrightarrow$ EM
Resonance	droplet-wave	harmony of phases	unspecified
Dispersion $\omega(k)$	$\omega_F^2\approx\sigma k^3/\rho$	$\omega^2\approx\omega_c^2+c^2k^2$	$\omega=ck$
Carrier $\lambda$	$\lambda_F$	$\lambda_{dB}$	$\lambda_{c}$
Statistical $\lambda$	$\lambda_F$	$\lambda_{dB}$	$\lambda_{dB}$

=== Madelung hydrodynamic analog ===
In 1926, Erwin Madelung had developed a hydrodynamic version of the Schrödinger equation. This formulation replaces Schrödinger's single linear equation with two non-linear ones, but it has the advantage that the physics can be study by analogy to hydrodynamics. The Madelung equations, being quantum analog of Euler equations of fluid dynamics, differ philosophically from the de Broglie–Bohm mechanics and are the basis of the stochastic interpretation of quantum mechanics.

== Surrealistic trajectories ==
In 1992, Englert, Scully, Sussman, and Walther proposed experiments that would show particles taking paths that differ from the Bohm trajectories. They described the Bohm trajectories as "surrealistic"; their proposal was later referred to as ESSW after the last names of the authors. In an unpublished preprint, Hiley, Callaghan, and Maroney presented a theory describing these trajectories as a consequence of the nonlocality inherent in Bohm's theory. In 2016, Mahler et al. verified the ESSW predictions and showed that the trajectories match the Hiley explanation of the surrealistic effect.

== See also ==
- Fluid analogs in quantum mechanics
- Local hidden-variable theory
- Madelung equations
- Probability current
- Quantum potential § Relativistic and field-theoretic extensions
- Stochastic electrodynamics
- Superfluid vacuum theory

== Sources ==
- Albert, David Z. (May 1994). "Bohm's Alternative to Quantum Mechanics". Scientific American. 270 (5): 58–67. Bibcode:1994SciAm.270e..58A. doi:10.1038/scientificamerican0594-58.
- Barbosa, G. D.; N. Pinto-Neto (2004). "A Bohmian Interpretation for Noncommutative Scalar Field Theory and Quantum Mechanics". Physical Review D. 69 (6) 065014. arXiv:hep-th/0304105. Bibcode:2004PhRvD..69f5014B. doi:10.1103/PhysRevD.69.065014. S2CID 119525006.
- Bohm, David (1952). "A Suggested Interpretation of the Quantum Theory in Terms of "Hidden Variables" I". Physical Review. 85 (2): 166–179. Bibcode:1952PhRv...85..166B. doi:10.1103/PhysRev.85.166. (full text)
- Bohm, David (1952). "A Suggested Interpretation of the Quantum Theory in Terms of "Hidden Variables", II". Physical Review. 85 (2): 180–193. Bibcode:1952PhRv...85..180B. doi:10.1103/PhysRev.85.180. (full text)
- Bohm, David (1990). "A new theory of the relationship of mind and matter" (PDF). Philosophical Psychology. 3 (2): 271–286. doi:10.1080/09515089008573004. Archived from the original (PDF) on 4 March 2016.
- Bohm, David; B.J. Hiley (1993). The Undivided Universe: An ontological interpretation of quantum theory. London: Routledge. ISBN 978-0-415-12185-9.
- Dürr, Detlef; Sheldon Goldstein; Roderich Tumulka; Nino Zanghì (December 2004). "Bohmian Mechanics" (PDF). Physical Review Letters. 93 (9) 090402. arXiv:quant-ph/0303156. Bibcode:2004PhRvL..93i0402D. doi:10.1103/PhysRevLett.93.090402. ISSN 0031-9007. PMID 15447078. S2CID 8720296.
- Goldstein, Sheldon (2001). "Bohmian Mechanics". Stanford Encyclopedia of Philosophy.
- Hall, Michael J. W. (2004). "Incompleteness of trajectory-based interpretations of quantum mechanics". Journal of Physics A: Mathematical and General. 37 (40): 9549–9556. arXiv:quant-ph/0406054. Bibcode:2004JPhA...37.9549H. doi:10.1088/0305-4470/37/40/015. S2CID 15196269. (Demonstrates incompleteness of the Bohm interpretation in the face of fractal, differentiable-nowhere wavefunctions.)
- Holland, Peter R. (1993). The Quantum Theory of Motion: An Account of the de Broglie–Bohm Causal Interpretation of Quantum Mechanics. Cambridge: Cambridge University Press. ISBN 978-0-521-48543-2.
- Nikolic, H. (2005). "Relativistic quantum mechanics and the Bohmian interpretation". Foundations of Physics Letters. 18 (6): 549–561. arXiv:quant-ph/0406173. Bibcode:2005FoPhL..18..549N. doi:10.1007/s10702-005-1128-1. S2CID 14006204.
- Passon, Oliver (2004). "Why isn't every physicist a Bohmian?". arXiv:quant-ph/0412119.
- Sanz, A. S.; F. Borondo (2007). "A Bohmian view on quantum decoherence". European Physical Journal D. 44 (2): 319–326. arXiv:quant-ph/0310096. Bibcode:2007EPJD...44..319S. doi:10.1140/epjd/e2007-00191-8. S2CID 18449109.
- Sanz, A. S. (2005). "A Bohmian approach to quantum fractals". Journal of Physics A: Mathematical and General. 38 (26): 6037–6049. arXiv:quant-ph/0412050. Bibcode:2005JPhA...38.6037S. doi:10.1088/0305-4470/38/26/013. S2CID 17633797. (Describes a Bohmian resolution to the dilemma posed by non-differentiable wavefunctions.)
- Silverman, Mark P. (1993). And Yet It Moves: Strange Systems and Subtle Questions in Physics. Cambridge: Cambridge University Press. ISBN 978-0-521-44631-0.
- Streater, Ray F. (2003). "Bohmian mechanics is a 'lost cause'". Archived from the original on 13 June 2006.
- Valentini, Antony; Hans Westman (2005). "Dynamical Origin of Quantum Probabilities". Proceedings of the Royal Society A: Mathematical, Physical and Engineering Sciences. 461 (2053): 253–272. arXiv:quant-ph/0403034. Bibcode:2005RSPSA.461..253V. doi:10.1098/rspa.2004.1394. S2CID 6589887.
- Bohmian mechanics on arxiv.org
