= Harvey R. Brown =

British philosopher (born 1950)

- Born: April 4, 1950 (age 76); United Kingdom

Philosophical work
- Era: Contemporary philosophy
- Region: Western philosophy
- School: Analytic philosophy
- Main interests: Philosophy of physics

Harvey Robert Brown FBA (born April 4, 1950) is a British philosopher of physics. He is a professor of philosophy at the University of Oxford and an emeritus fellow of Wolfson College, Oxford, as well as a fellow of the British Academy.

From 1978 to 1984, he was assistant professor at the University of Campinas. In 1984 he became university lecturer in philosophy of physics at the University of Oxford, where he was promoted to reader in philosophy in 1996 and professor of philosophy of physics in 2006.

== Selected works ==
- 1984. Albert Einstein. A simple man of vision, in Portuguese, Brasiliense, São Paulo.
- 1988. H.R. Brown and H.R. Harré (eds.). Philosophical Foundations of Quantum Field Theory, Oxford: Clarendon Press. Reprinted in paperback, 1990.
- 1991. S. Saunders and H.R. Brown (eds.). The Philosophy of Vacuum. Oxford: Clarendon Press.
- 1996. 'Mindful of quantum possibilities'. British Journal for the Philosophy of Science, 47: 189–200.
- Brown, Harvey R. (1997). "On the role of special relativity in general relativity". International Studies in the Philosophy of Science. 11: 67–81. doi:10.1080/02698599708573551.
- 1999. 'Aspects of objectivity in quantum mechanics'. In, J. Butterfield and C. Pagonis (eds.), From Physics to Philosophy. Cambridge: Cambridge University Press: 45–70.
- Brown, Harvey R. (2001). "The origins of length contraction: I. The Fitz Gerald–Lorentz deformation hypothesis". American Journal of Physics. 69 (10): 1044–1054. arXiv:gr-qc/0104032. Bibcode:2001AmJPh..69.1044B. doi:10.1119/1.1379733. S2CID 2945585.
- Holland, Peter; Brown, Harvey R. (2003). "The non-relativistic limits of the Maxwell and Dirac equations: The role of Galilean and gauge invariance". Studies in History and Philosophy of Science Part B: Studies in History and Philosophy of Modern Physics. 34 (2): 161–187. Bibcode:2003SHPMP..34..161H. doi:10.1016/S1355-2198(03)00005-4.
- 2005. Physical Relativity. Space-time structure from a dynamical perspective. Oxford: Oxford University Press.
