= Joyce Collin-Smith =

English spiritualist and author

- Born: Joyce Yvonne Hartley; 11 January 1919; Oxford, England
- Died: 9 November 2010 (aged 91); Scarborough, England
- Spouse: Richard Collin-Smith (m. 1948; died 1992)
- Relatives: Rodney Collin (brother-in-law)

Education
- Education: Oxford High School
- Alma mater: Faculty of Astrological Studies
- Website: www.joycecollinsmith.co.uk

Joyce Yvonne Collin-Smith (née Hartley; 11 January 1919 – 9 November 2010), was an English author, journalist, and spiritualist.

== Early life and education ==
Joyce Yvonne Hartley was born on 11 January 1919 in Oxford, England. She was the daughter of Harold Osborne Hartley, editor of The Oxford Times, and Grace Sophia Hartley (née Horsefield). She attended Oxford High School on Belbroughton Road, Oxford. As a child, Hartley preferred the realm of imagination to the real world, often feeling as though there was someone in the room with her.

== Career ==
After leaving school, Collin-Smith joined The Oxford Times as its first woman reporter. She then moved to the Reading Standard. During World War II, she served with a Polish bomber squadron in the Women's Auxiliary Air Force. She was later employed by a secret Combined Armed Services establishment, where she was tasked with typing out transcripts of conversations between prominent German prisoners of war whose cells had been bugged.

In the 1930s, Collin-Smith explored esotericism through her in-depth study of Rudolf Steiner. She was enticed by the notion of different levels of reality and different modes of consciousness put forward in his Knowledge Of The Higher Worlds And Its Attainment. The idea of listening to God was of particular interest to her. After attending a meeting given by Frank Buchman, founder of the Oxford Group (later known as Moral Re-Armament), Collin-Smith was shocked to discover that the organisation kept personal files on its supporters with details of their personal "sins" revealed during shared confession. She shared her findings in an article for The Oxford Times, provoking a torrent of correspondence from academics, clergymen and parents who had lost their children to the movement.

Collin-Smith applied herself to studying the teachings of Maharishi Mahesh Yogi, who personally introduced her to his practice of transcendental meditation. She was introduced to the ideas of the Fourth Way by philosopher George Gurdjieff, a close associate of Rodney Collin, who became her mentor. In the early 1950s, she travelled to Gurdjieff's commune in the suburbs of Mexico City to practise his work.

One day, on top of the Pyramid of the Moon at Teotihuacan, she turned towards Collin and experienced a sudden epiphany: Here, standing before her, was the imaginary playmate of her childhood: "You're my brother! You're my brother!" she cried. "Very likely," Collin responded. "There is certainly a Karmic link."

In the mid-1950s, Collin-Smith enrolled at the Faculty of Astrological Studies, where she took a diploma. After leaving the Maharishi, she established herself as an astrological consultant, tarot reader, esoteric writer and spiritual teacher.

In England, Collin-Smith turned her attention to Muhammad Subuh Sumohadiwidjojo, founder of the international spiritual movement Subud. When he and his wife visited London in 1956, she experienced the releasing effect of latihan, a principal practice of his organisation. Notwithstanding, she was unsettled by the violent cleansing and sexual stimulation, which she noted "rose to such a pitch that people were breaking up their marriages and linking up with others, and again others, like a perpetual version of an old-fashioned 'excuse me' dance."

In the early 1960s, Collin-Smith returned her attention to Maharishi Mahesh Yogi. She spent around 8 years with the Maharishi, feeling that she had found a rolemodel, but this satisfaction was short-lived. Some time later, she began to feel that his intents were not as virtuous as they had once been, noting that he had become "rather ruthless" in his spiritual power and showed a lack of concern when others began breaking down as a result of practising his technique. Collin-Smith was herself once driven to the verge of suicide as a result of overindulging in his practices. The final straw of her disillusionment was the arrival of The Beatles into Yogi's establishment in the 1960s.

Collin-Smith's writings explored her ideas of spirituality, combining her ideas of traditional Western and Eastern philosophies with modern schools of thought. In 1988, she wrote an autobiographical work Call No Man Master, in which she recorded her spiritual adventures. Her other works include The Pathless Land (2003), an exploration of esoteric experience, and two novels, the best-seller Locusts and Wild Honey (1954) and Of Fire & Music (2006).

An Eastern Daily Press journalist who wrote a feature in 2006 was impressed by her ability to foretell the future: "I have had some clients for years," she said, "They often come back when there is a big change in their lives and they say to me that generally what I said to them came true." Collin-Smith remained a popular speaker at conferences until she was well into her 80s.

== Personal life ==
Collin-Smith met her husband, Richard Frederick Logan Collin-Smith, a war journalist, through his brother Rodney Collin. They married in 1948 in Paddington, London and moved to Africa, where her first book Locusts and Wild Honey was set.

== Bibliography ==
- Of Fire and Music (Kempton Marks, 2006)
- The Pathless Land (Authors On Line Limited, 2003)
- The Occult Webb: An Appreciation of the Life and Work of James Webb (Colombo, 1999)
- Call No Man Master (Authors On Line Limited, 1988)
- Astrology: The Spiral of Life (Astrological Association of Great Britain, 1980)
- A Wreath of Chains (W. H. Allen & Co., 1960)
- Jeremy Craven (Hodder & Stoughton, 1958)
- The scorpion on the stone (James Barrie, 1954)
- Locusts and Wild Honey (Little, Brown and Company, 1954)
