= Systematics (systems theory) =

Study of multi-term systems

Systematics is the name given by John Godolphin Bennett (1897–1974) to a branch of systems science that he developed in the mid-twentieth century. Also referred to as the theory of Multi-Term Systems or Bennettian Systematics, it focuses on types, levels, and degrees of complexity in systems, the qualities emergent at these levels, and the ability to represent and practically deal with ("understand") complexity using abstract models. Thus to understand the notions of sameness and difference requires a system or universe of discourse with a minimum of two terms or elements. To understand the concept of relatedness requires three, and so on.

Bennettian Systematics evolved through various stages of formulation as described in his major, four-volume work The Dramatic Universe (initially published 1955-1966) and in various articles in Systematics: The Journal of the Institute for the Comparative Study of History, Philosophy and the Sciences, published from 1963 to 1974. Bennettian Systematics has been further refined and advanced by students such as A. G. E. Blake, Anthony Hodgson, Kenneth Pledge, Henri Bortoft, Richard Heath and others.

== Overview ==
Bennett has described his discipline of Systematics in quite general terms as "the study of systems and their application to the problem of understanding ourselves and the world." He notes in this general context 4 branches of Systematics:

- Pure Systematics – seeks "to identify and describe the universal properties or attributes common to all systems".
- Formal Systematics – studies "the properties of systems without reference to the nature of the terms. It consists mainly of the investigation of possible modes of connectedness which evidently can be very complex for systems with more than three or four terms".
- Applied Systematics – "the study of systems occurring in our experience and is chiefly directed to the identification of the terms and their characteristics".
- Practical Systematics – focuses on "the application of the understanding gained through the study of systems to the problems that arise in all departments of life".

Bennett's use of the term "Systematics" is basically synonymous with what today falls under the terms "systemics", "systemology", "systems science", and "systems theory". However, his own specific work under the name "Systematics" takes approaches that are still unfamiliar to many current systems specialists, making his work a specialty in a much broader field. In addition, the use of the term "systematics" in biology to refer to the classification of types and forms of organisms creates ambiguity and rather overwhelms the term's current viability within general systemology. Thus reference can be made simply to "Bennettian Systems" (or Systemics or Systematics), or to "Multi-Term Systems" to describe his work and its continuations.

Formal Bennettian systems are defined around and focus on the idea of logical or qualitative complexity rather than quantitative complexity. There is thus a possible analogy to the philosophical program of logical atomism. ("Quantitative complexity", as contrasted with "qualitative", results from the presence in a practical setting of two or more actual components of the same qualitative type. However, in practical Systematics, the quantity or amount of a component also has concrete qualitative effects, and the two categories cannot always be separated.)

Thus in formal Systematics, Bennettian systems are abstract, and each system represents a qualitative or logical "type" or level analogous to the logical levels used by Bertrand Russell in his Theory of Types.

Each formal level consists of qualitatively independent but mutually relevant "terms" that constitute a "universe of discourse" specific to that level, and terminology suitable at one level can cause category confusion when used in other contexts.

Every multi-term system so-defined has its special system-level attribute or characteristic emergent quality, such as "dynamism" for the triad, or "significance" for the pentad. The emergence of these qualities, according to the work of Anthony Blake in what he calls Lattice Systematics, is mysterious but not random and occurs within a process involving both increasing "spiritualization" of will and increasing specification or "materialization" of function.

The logical level of the system depends on the number of the qualitatively different but mutually relevant terms in the system. Bennettian systems thus increase in qualitative complexity, and display new emergent qualities, in a quantized, progressive series as the number of qualitatively distinct terms within the system increases.

Conversely, the "terms" of a given formal system correlate in a general way with the specific degree, type, or level of the system they occur in, so that the terms of a dyad are characterized as "poles", those of a triad as "impulses", those of a tetrad as "sources", those of a pentad as "limits," and so on.

Each system beyond the first contains subsystems and all systems, theoretically, are embedded in supersystems with a higher number of terms.

In practical Systematics, Bennett carried this process of elaboration up to the 12-term system as best he could within the constraints of the very limited technical vocabulary currently available to make such distinctions. Beyond the 12-term system he spoke of "societies".

Bennett correlates the logical levels or leaps of qualitative complexity with what he calls the "concrete" or "qualitative" significance of number, perhaps again analogous to what Russell calls "relation number" in Principia Mathematica and in looser reference to Pythagorean traditions, although Bennett was at pains to distinguish what he was doing from various kinds of mere "numerology".

The series of Bennettian systems includes the monad, dyad, triad, tetrad, and so on, open-endedly. Systems progress in complexity from the monad up, and from vague wholeness to increasingly articulate structure that reaches into society, history and the ontological fabric of the cosmos.

=== Practical and applied Bennettian systems ===
The series of Multi-Term Systems can serve in applications as simplified but progressively complex outer checklists to ascertain the objective diagnostic completeness of a survey and analysis of a system or situation. Conversely, the system models can be used "inwardly" as an aid to subjectively assessing one's own impartiality, wisdom and adequacy of comprehension. They thus can point toward real structures and processes in the outer world of fact as well as, logically, those structures and processes in the inner world of values and human capacities.

The Enneagram of Process of Gurdjieff is a central but partial part of the Bennettian Systematics of the ennead.

=== History ===
Systematics came in part out of the Pythagorean historical tradition but was influenced by twentieth century movements such as A. N. Whitehead's philosophy of organism, C. S. Peirce's pragmatism, and Bertrand Russell's logical atomism, theory of types, and logic of relations. However, it was independent of Bertalanffy's general systems theory and other systems thinking work. The strongest personal influence was from Gurdjieff and his writings. Gurdjieff had taught the significance of the 'law of three' and the 'law of seven' in a meta-scientific context, but Bennett proposed that there was a 'law' for every integral number, and that this could help people understand practical things such as management and education.

Parallels can be drawn between Bennettian Systematics and the work of C. G. Jung and Marie Louise von Franz on number as archetypal, as well as with the philosophies of engineers such as Buckminster Fuller and Arthur Young.

=== Programme ===
Bennettian Systematics has an integrative programme. Throughout all cultures and throughout all disciplines there are discernible threads of meaning associated with multi-term systems that might otherwise be missed. Bennettian Systematics links with understanding which is connected with structural unity and how insight from one area of experience can be transferred to another without distortion. A journal called Systematics was launched by Bennett’s Institute for the Comparative Study of History, Philosophy and the Sciences in 1963 to publish a diversity of articles relating to this programme. Systematics also led into the development of a new learning system called structural communication, which later became a broad methodology called logovisual thinking (LVT).

== See also ==
- John G. Bennett
- Systemics
- Systemography
- Systems philosophy
- Systems science
- Systems theory
