= Subud and religion =

Subud literature rejects the suggestion that Subud is a religion, but rather describes it as "spiritual dancing". The difference between religion and spirituality is much debated. Subud is treated as a religious organisation in some countries, such as the UK, where it is registered as religious charity, but in other places, such as Indonesia, it is viewed by the government as an education organisation, since the government officially endorse only six religions, and religious conflicts between majority and minority are rife. It appears that Subud (along with numerous other groups with similar reservations) is forced because of conditions in some countries to register as a religion as there are no alternative categories offered for registration.

== Advice and teachings ==
Subud is sometimes said to not be a religion on the grounds that it does not propound a specific teaching, nor does it insist that members adhere to any given set of beliefs. Rather, Subud practitioners may individually feel that they receive regular contact with God or some divine reality, from whom or which a kind of inner wisdom may be received directly. This formulation is vulnerable to criticism on the grounds that (a) some "religions" may be described similarly, and/or (b) that many Subud members in fact propound certain beliefs as 'Subud' beliefs. In a paper published in the academic journal 'Group Dynamics: Theory, Research and Practice', Stephen C. Urlich of Lincoln University concludes: "In this article, I have shown that despite Subud's claims to the contrary, it does have a complex theology."

== Universalist pluralism ==
Another reason often given is that Subud is universalist and pluralist, welcoming members from all religions (including atheists). There do, however, exist religions which allow followers to belong to other religions as well, most notably Buddhism and Unitarian Universalism. A practical reason for this explanation arises from the fact that some religions, such as Christianity, Baháʼí Faith and Islam, do see participation in Subud as contravening their stance forbidding multiple identification. Subud practitioners have naturally sought to avoid a situation in which followers of those religions would face religious restrictions against joining Subud.

Subud sometimes finds itself on the other end of this dynamic—for example, when it recommends practitioners against "mixing" Subud with other practices such as yoga or meditation. Since yoga and meditation are major elements of Hinduism and Buddhism, some Subud members complain that this conflicts with the encouragement to practice the religion of their choice. However, the restriction is actually upon doing yoga or other meditation during the Latihan itself; i.e. mixing spiritual practices during the same half-hour. Hindu and Buddhist members are not required to give up any aspect of their religion outside of the Latihan hall.

Subud is sometimes described as "non-denominational", a curious term which usually refers to religious denominations within Christianity. "Non-sectarian" would probably be most accurate, as within Subud the mixing of religious groups goes hand in hand with the mingling of different ethnic groups from around the world.
