= Dankmar Bosse =

German geologist

Dankmar Bosse (born 30 May 1940 in Weimar) is a German geologist.

He studied at the Bergakademie in Freiberg/Saxony Geology, Palaeontology and Mineralogy and worked at the Central Geological Institute in Berlin-East until 1989, mainly on topics related to the regional geology of Central Europe. After that, he worked as a freelancer, giving seminars, lectures, excursions and geology lectures at Waldorf schools. Since his student days he has devoted himself to anthroposophical research work in all geoscientific fields.

After the publication of the German original of his book "Mutual Evolution of Earth and Humanity: Sketch of a Geology and Paleontology of the Living Earth" in 2002 he was accused by Wolfgang Schad and other Goetheanists of falsifications of the source material used and scientifically untenable statements and interpretations.

He lives in Berlin-Pankow.

== Publications ==
- Vergleich der anthroposophischen und der geologischen Gliederung der Erdgeschichte. In: Der Merkurstab, 45. Jahrgang, Heft 4, Juli/August 1992, Seite 291–310.
- Johann Wolfgang von Goethe: Die Metamorphose des Granits. Substanz- und Gestaltbildung des Erdorganismus. Stuttgart 1994 (Hrsg.).
- Goethes Initiation und die Ursphäre der Erde. Carl Unger Preis 1995. Studien und Versuche 40. Stuttgart 1995.
- Die gemeinsame Evolution von Erde und Mensch: Entwurf einer Geologie und Paläontologie der lebendigen Erde. Stuttgart 2002.
- Mutual Evolution of Earth and Humanity: Sketch of a Geology and Paleontology of the Living Earth. Lindisfarne Books, 16 April 2019.
- Die Lebenssphäre der Erde: Ihre Evolution in den geologischen Phänomenen, Rudolf Steiners Forschungen und in Goethes Studien. Stuttgart 2012.
- Die Evolution der Minerale zwischen Kosmos und Erde: Entwurf einer Mineralogie und Kristallografie der lebendigen Erde. Stuttgart 2015.
