= Susila =

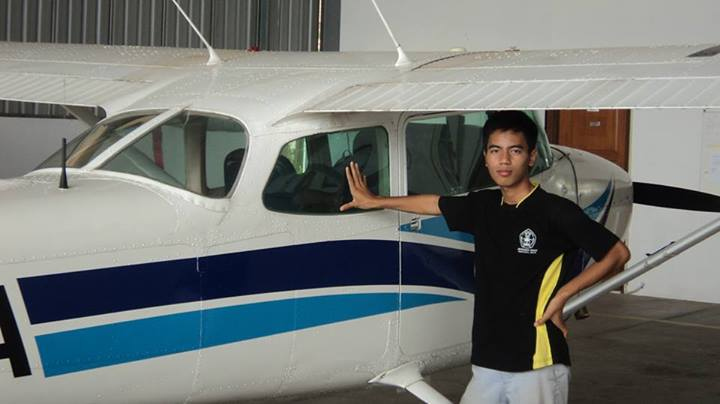
Komang Susila Yana

Susila (Sinhala: සුසිලා) is a feminine given name. Notable people with this name include:

- Susila Bonnerjee (died 1920), medical doctor and suffragist
- Susila Kottage (born 1957), Sri Lankan actress
- Susila Kuragama (1943–2016), Sri Lankan actress

== See also ==
- Susila Budhi Dharma, 1952 book by Muhammad Subuh Sumohadiwidjojo
