= Susila Budhi Dharma =

Book by Muhammad Subuh Sumohadiwidjojo

"Seven Circle" symbol of Subud

Susila Budhi Dharma is a book written by Muhammad Subuh Sumohadiwidjojo, the founder of the World Subud Association, in the city of Jogjakarta, Indonesia, in 1952. Its name corresponds to the three main qualities that are to be developed through the training in the Subud path. The name "Subud" is a contraction of these three Javanese words of Sanskrit derivation.

== Life forces ==
The book refers to the series of experiences that practitioners of the Subud 'latihan' (exercise) may go through in the process of training their inner feeling in practical life. It describes how one can feel the various influences of the forces that accompany human beings in this world, i.e. material, vegetable, animal and "ordinary human" forces. The book discusses how, through awareness of their influences upon the inner feeling, it is possible to integrate and be in harmony with these forces, which were provided to humanity for living in this world, and to be no longer dominated by them, through the support of the Great Life Force.

The book explains many examples of how the Subud latihan (the spiritual exercise of Subud) may play a role in daily life. Situations are described whereby a person may feel and 'receive' what occurs in the inner feeling when approaching this or that circumstance. This supposedly represents 'training' in how to understand the various indications so that human beings may be able to deal with the pressure of the life forces and consequently develop their truly human qualities and faculties.

Subuh's writing illustrates how humans come to be in thrall to material things which they own or desire. It offers an explanation as to why inner conflicts arise and how people can so easily be swept up by impulses, moods and emotions inconsistent with humane action. In the book the various "life forces" which struggle for dominance within a person's consciousness are referred to as "Nafsu".

The book is not intended to be a teaching but to indicate what one might experience as a result of the continued practice of the latihan.

== Name ==
"Susila" is said to represent a quality of human beings which enables their behaviour to be 'noble' because they are conscious of what is right and what is wrong. "Budhi" is said to be part of God's authority which was placed inside every creature. When this Budhi is directed voluntarily by people in the direction of God's will, then their lives will supposedly be blessed. "Dharma" is said to be the projection in practical human life of God's blessing. Accordingly, various forms of human activity, including business, arts, education, health and so on, may become outer expressions of the grace that humanity has received within, thereby engendering welfare and happiness. Pak Subuh called this "True Human Culture".

The word dharma is central to both Hindu and Buddhist thought, and the term Budhi shares a root with the word Buddha. Although the author described himself as a conventional Muslim, the book's name chimes with ancient Indian wisdom. This is consistent with the Wayang stories whose characters (such as The Pandava brothers) and parables Subuh occasionally refers to in his earlier talks. (These popular stories drawn from the Mahābhārata have, for centuries, underpinned and enriched Javanese spirituality.)

== Writing style ==
The book was written in High-Javanese language and Kawi, and it was reputedly received in the form of a poem, accompanied by traditional Javanese melodies. It was recommended by Pak Subuh as being for only Subud members to read, since people who have not experienced the latihan of Subud might try to understand the book in an analytical way, yet be unable to relate it to their own direct experiences. There is some discussion about this as the Subud association does not aim to be secretive, but also wants to avoid making unverifiable claims. The book was (and is) intended as an optional supplementary guide for people already undertaking their own spiritual journey.
