= John G. Bennett =

British academic and writer (1897–1974)

John Godolphin Bennett
- Born: 8 June 1897; London, England
- Died: 13 December 1974 (aged 77)
- Other name: J.G. Bennett
- Education: King's College School, London; Royal Military Academy, Woolwich
- Known for: Books on psychology and spirituality
- Website: Official website

John Godolphin Bennett (8 June 1897 – 13 December 1974) was a British academic and writer. He is best known for his books on psychology and spirituality, particularly on the teachings of G. I. Gurdjieff. Bennett met Gurdjieff in Constantinople in October 1920 and later helped to co-ordinate the work of Gurdjieff in England after the guru had moved to Paris. He also was active in starting the British section of the Subud movement, and co-founded its British headquarters.

Bennett was born in London, England; educated at King's College School, London; Royal Military Academy, Woolwich; School of Military Engineering, Chatham; and the School of Oriental Studies, London. He was a Fellow of the Institute of Fuel, London, from 1938 onwards; Chairman, Conference of Research Associations, 1943–1945; Chairman, Solid Fuel Industry, British Standards Institution, 1937–1942; Chairman and Director, Institute for the comparative study of History, Philosophy, and the Sciences, Kingston upon Thames, 1946–1959.

== Early life, World War I, marriage ==
Bennett's parents met in Florence, Italy; they later married. His mother was American and his father was British. In Bennett's infancy, his family were moderately wealthy and traveled frequently in Europe. In 1912, his father, who was a noted traveller, adventurer and linguist, lost all of his money and his wife's in an investment that failed. Bennett later displayed an extraordinary talent for languages, which enabled him to talk with many spiritual teachers in their native tongues. He studied Hindu, Buddhist, Islamic and Christian sacred texts in their original languages.

Bennett makes little reference to his childhood in his autobiography, Witness. Elsewhere he credits his mother with instilling in him the virtues of hard work and tolerance.

At school, he excelled in sports and captained the school rugby football team. He won a scholarship in mathematics from Oxford University, but never had the chance to take advantage of this because of the outbreak of the Great War. He continued to play rugby football for the army (against such opponents as the New Zealand national team), breaking his arm once and his collar bone twice.

In the First World War, at the age of nineteen, Bennett served as a subaltern in the Royal Engineers, with responsibility for signals and telegraphy.

In France in March 1918, he was blown off his motorcycle by an exploding shell. Taken to a military hospital, operated upon, and apparently in a coma for six days, Bennett had an out-of-body experience. He became convinced that there is something in man which can exist independently of the body.

"It was perfectly clear to me that being dead is quite unlike being very ill or very weak or helpless. So far as I was concerned, there was no fear at all. And yet I have never been a brave man and was certainly still afraid of heavy gun fire. I was cognizant of my complete indifference toward my own body."

This experience set his life on a new course. He described the return to normal consciousness as the return to a body that was now in some sense a stranger.

In the closing months of the First World War, Bennett undertook an intensive course in the Turkish language at the School of Oriental and African Studies, London, and was posted to Constantinople. He was assigned to a sensitive position in Anglo-Turkish relations, at the time of the breakup of the Ottoman Empire and rise in Turkish nationalism. His fluency made him the confidant of many high-ranking Turkish political figures; it also helped him to develop his knowledge of Turkey and to gain insights into non-European ways of thinking. A notable piece of initiative drew the attention of General Edmund Allenby, and a mention in C-in-C's dispatches. Bennett was recruited to be the head of Military Intelligence "B" Division, with responsibility for the entire Middle Eastern region.

"All day long I was dealing with different races: English, French, Italian, Greek, Armenian, Turkish, Kurdish, Russian, Arab, Jews and people so mixed up as to be no race at all. Each and every one was convinced of the superiority of his own people. How could everyone be right and all the rest wrong? It was nonsense."

Bennett's eighteen months' tenure in this position were so eventful, that he is still regarded as a major figure in the political life of Turkey in that period. Bennett's success resulted in some animosities among his superiors and he was recalled to London in January 1921. He resigned his commission with the rank of Captain and a pension for life. He kept an abiding love for Turkey for the rest of his life.

After the war, Bennett had married Evelyn, with whom he had a daughter, Ann, born August 1920. Evelyn had stayed in England when he was posted to Turkey. Bennett's immersion in Turkish affairs and his relationship with Winifred Beaumont, an English woman living in Turkey, placed increasing strain on the marriage. In 1924, Evelyn Bennett sued for divorce. Bennett later married Beaumont, who was twenty years his senior; they were together until her death in 1958. He married a third time in 1958, to Elizabeth Mayall.

== Gurdjieff and Ouspensky ==
After the First World War and the Russian Revolution, many displaced people passed through Constantinople en route to the West. Part of Bennett's job was to monitor their movements. Among them were G.I. Gurdjieff and P.D. Ouspensky, whom Bennett met through Prince Sabahaddin. This reformist thinker had introduced him to a wide range of religious and occultist systems, including Theosophy and Anthroposophy. Bennett became determined to pursue the search for a deeper reality. He had been profoundly impressed with Gurdjieff's ideas about the arrangement of the human organism and the possibility of a man's transformation to a higher state of being, and would later dedicate much of his life to the elaboration and dissemination of those ideas.

Gurdjieff and Ouspensky moved on to Europe, and Bennett remained in Turkey, committed to his work and fascinated by the political and social developments in Turkey. The sultanate fell, and on 29 October 1923 the Turkish republic was proclaimed.

Gurdjieff founded his Institute for the Harmonious Development of Man at the Château Le Prieuré in Fontainebleau-Avon, south of Paris, in October 1922. Bennett visited in the summer of 1923, spending three months at the institute. This experience further convinced him that Gurdjieff had profound knowledge and understanding of techniques by which man can achieve transformation. Gurdjieff encouraged Bennett to stay longer, but Bennett was short of money and so felt obliged to return to work in England. Though Bennett expected to return to the group soon, he would not meet Gurdjieff again until 1948.

Bennett served the British government as a consultant on the Middle East, and interpreter at the 1924 conference in London intended to settle disputes between Greece and Turkey. He was invited to stand for parliament, but he chose instead to give his personal studies precedence over his public life.

He joined Ouspensky's groups, and continued to study Gurdjieff's system with them for fifteen years. Ouspensky broke off all contact with Gurdjieff himself in the early 1920s.

== Coal industry ==
During this time, Bennett became involved with various coal mining ventures in Greece and Turkey. These were ultimately unsuccessful, but in the process he acquired expertise in mining and coal chemistry. He worked for four years in Greece, where he was also involved in protracted negotiations involving land claims by members of the deposed Turkish royal family.

In 1938, Bennett was asked to head Britain's newest industrial research organisation, the British Coal Utilisation Research Association (BCURA). With the outbreak of World War II, BCURA's research was focused on developing fuel-efficient fireplaces and finding alternatives to oil. BCURA developed cars powered by coal-gas and a coal-based plastic.

== Group work ==
In 1941, Ouspensky left England to live in the United States. By now, Bennett was running his own study groups and giving talks on the subject of Gurdjieff's system. The groups continued and expanded in London throughout the Second World War. Bennett began writing and developing his own ideas in addition to Gurdjieff's. Ouspensky repudiated him in 1945, which proved very painful for Bennett. He had lost touch with Gurdjieff during the war and believed him to be dead.

"Ouspensky fell under the impression that Bennett was setting himself up as a teacher and plagiarising his lecture material. Instructions were sent to all members of Ouspensky's groups to disassociate themselves from Bennett, who found himself vilified and ostracised, but still supported by a small loyal following. He decided to go ahead with his work of communicating his understanding of the System to people, and to create a society or institute to serve as its vehicle".

== Coombe Springs ==
In 1946, Bennett and his wife founded the non-profit Institute for the Comparative Study of History, Philosophy and the Sciences:

"To promote research and other scientific work in connection with the factors which influence development and retrogression in man and their operation in individuals and communities; to investigate the origin and elaboration of scientific hypotheses and secular and religious philosophies and their bearing on general theories of Man and his place in the universe; and to study comparative methodology in history, philosophy and natural science".

The Institute bought Coombe Springs, a seven-acre estate in Kingston upon Thames, Surrey, which had housed research laboratories used by BCURA. The Bennetts moved in with ten of Bennett's closest pupils, with the intention of starting a small research community. Coombe Springs became a centre for group work. In addition to the small community who lived there permanently, hundreds of people visited Coombe Springs for meetings and summer schools.

The old laboratories were used as dormitory space; they were known as the "fishbowl" because of the large amount of glass they had. A "new building" was later built for superior accommodation. The main house was used for meetings as well as accommodation. Coombe Springs took its name from an original Elizabethan spring house in the grounds. Until the mid-19th century, it had provided water to the palace at Hampton Court.

Bennett believed that Gurdjieff's system could be reconciled with modern science. He started work on a five-dimensional geometry which included "eternity" as a second time-like dimension, introducing this in his first published book, The Crisis in Human Affairs (1948).

== Reunion with Gurdjieff ==
Ouspensky died in 1947. In 1948, Bennett went to the United States and met Ouspensky's wife, through whom he learned that Gurdjieff had survived the Nazi occupation of France and was living in Paris. Though it was 25 years since they had last met (due mainly to Ouspensky's longstanding veto against Gurdjieff to members of his groups), Bennett quickly decided to renew contact. In the 18 months before Gurdjieff's death (in October 1949), Bennett visited him frequently. He also continued his crowded professional schedule (he was now working for the Powell Duffryn coal company) and his responsibilities towards the group work at Coombe Springs.

A month spent working very intensively with Gurdjieff's group in the summer of 1949 laid the foundation for a significant transformation in his life and spiritual work. At that time, Gurdjieff's apartment in Paris had become a 'Mecca' to the followers of his ideas, who converged from many different countries. Bennett learnt of Gurdjieff's writings, and read Beelzebub's Tales to His Grandson for the first time. At the beginning of 1949, Gurdjieff named Bennett as his 'Representative for England'. Bennett later gave public lectures in London on Gurdjieff and his ideas.

This period was described by Bennett's third wife, Elizabeth Bennett (1918–1991), who was part of the study group, in her book Idiots in Paris: Diaries of J.G. Bennett and Elizabeth Bennett, 1949. Her memoir was based on J.G. Bennett's diaries and on her own memories. A third paperback edition was published posthumously in 2017.

Gurdjieff's death in 1949 was a serious blow for all his followers. Disagreements arose within the group, partly as a result of Gurdjieff's having allocated his closest associates with conflicting areas of authority. In Bennett's case, the conflict was exacerbated by his own interpretation and development of Gurdieff's ideas.

After Gurdjieff's death, the various groups looked to Jeanne de Salzmann to give them direction and hold them together, but there was little inherent harmony among them. At this time Bennett was a member of a small group headed by Madame de Salzmann, and he put his work at Coombe Springs under her overall guidance.

In 1950, Bennett was falsely accused of harbouring communists on his staff, during a communist scare in Great Britain, and he was forced to resign from Powell Dufryn. (He later resisted several attractive offers to return to a career in industrial research and administration). He began to concentrate more fully on the group work at Coombe Springs. He lectured frequently, trying to fulfill a promise he had made to Gurdjieff to do everything in his power to propagate his ideas. Friendly relations continued with Madame de Salzmann and her groups throughout 1951 and 1952, but by then Bennett was convinced that his more senior students were not making progress. He believed that he had to learn firsthand whether there still existed an ancient tradition or source from which Gurdjieff had derived his teaching.

== Travels in the Middle East ==
In 1953, Bennett undertook a long journey to the Middle East (West Asia), visiting Turkey, Syria, Iraq and Iran. His search, chronicled in his book Journeys in Islamic Countries (reprinted in paperback in 2001), brought him into contact with Sufis of extraordinary spiritual accomplishment, such as Emin Chikou (1890–1964) (known in Syria as Mohammad Amin Sheikho) and Farhâd Dede (1882-1977), the former of whom led Bennett indirectly to a profound meeting with Shaykh Abdullah Fa'izi ad-Daghestani (1891–1973). Bennett described him as "a true saint in whom one feels an immediate complete trust. With him there were no lengthy arguments or quotations from the scriptures." Their chance meeting on a mountaintop in Damascus is chronicled, albeit briefly, in his book Subud. Bennett concludes that Shaykh Daghestani was in possession of "powers of a kind that I had already seen in Gurdjieff and one or two others, and prepared me to take very seriously anything that he might [have to] say."

During 1954, differences of opinion became more obvious between Bennett and Madame de Salzmann regarding the promulgation of Gurdjieff's teachings. Bennett decided that an effectual working relationship with her groups was not possible. He wanted to execute Gurdjieff's last directives literally, by disseminating his ideas and writings as widely as possible, especially Beelzebub's Tales to his Grandson, which Madame de Salzmann wanted to keep away from the public eye.

In 1955, Bennett initiated a project to build an unusual nine-sided meeting hall at Coombe Springs for the performance of Gurdjieff's sacred dance movements. This, together with his public lectures in London, completed the rift with Madame de Salzmann. The project took two years to complete. At the opening in 1957, Bennett commented that the real value of such a project was in building a community rather than the building itself.

== Subud ==
In 1956, Bennett was introduced to Subud, a spiritual movement originating in Java (an island in the Republic of Indonesia). For a number of reasons, Bennett felt that Gurdjieff had expected the arrival of a very important teaching from Indonesia. In spite of deep reservations, in November 1956 Bennett allowed himself to be 'opened' by Husein Rofé, a native Englishman (1922–2008) who had studied in the East. Rofé used the latihan (the primary spiritual exercise used in Subud).

Bennett regarded the latihan as being akin to what the mystics call diffuse contemplation. He also felt that the latihan has the power to awaken a person's conscience, the spiritual faculty that Gurdjieff regarded as necessary for salvation. Bennett sent an invitation to Subud's founder, Muhammad Subuh Sumohadiwidjojo (1901–1987) (aka Pak Subuh), to come to England. Pak Subuh came to Coombe Springs, where all Bennett's pupils were given the opportunity to be 'opened'. Soon Bennett was instrumental in spreading Subud practice all over the world. He travelled extensively to spread the Subud exercise, sometimes in the company of Pak Subuh. Bennett translated Pak Subuh's lectures into various languages. His introductory book on Subud, titled Concerning Subud (1959), sold thousands of copies worldwide.

Bennett's deep involvement in Subud meant less participation in the work-group activities and exercises that had been practised until he began this work. The meeting hall was left unfinished without its intended viewers' balcony and its striking pentagonal floor was filled in to allow for latihans. Its original purpose was not to be fulfilled for many years.

Some of Bennett's pupils were dismayed. Subud's spontaneous exercise seemed to some to be the antithesis of Gurdjieff's methods for spiritual awakening, and Bennett's enthusiasm for it served to deepen the divisions within the Gurdjieff groups. Many people left the Coombe Springs groups, but others came in large numbers. For several years Coombe Springs was the headquarters of the Subud movement in Europe, attracting both serious seekers and sensation seekers.

In 1958, monks from the Benedictine Abbey of St. Wandrille, interested in Subud, contacted Bennett. The following year he made the first of many visits to the abbey to teach the monks. These visits brought him into close contact with the Catholic Church. Dom Albert-Jacques Bescond, OSB (1920–1986) was the first monk from the abbey to be 'opened', followed by many others. At St. Wandrille, Bennett first had a deep experience of what he believed was the destined unification of Islam and Christianity. He had given this possibility philosophical expression through his concept of 'essential will', as detailed in his The Dramatic Universe (4 vols). Soon after, he formally entered the Catholic Church.

By 1960, Bennett had concluded that the practice of 'latihan' alone was inadequate, and he resumed the work that he had learned from Gurdjieff. By 1962, Bennett left the Subud organization, feeling that a return to the Gurdjieff method was necessary.

Although he always said that he had derived great benefit from Subud, his departure aroused animosity and dismay from Subud members, and many turned against him.

Meanwhile, the Institute had been largely given over to Subud to the extent, at one time, of instigating a move to forbid the sale of Gurdjieff's books at Coombe Springs. In spite of this, Bennett reinstated lecture courses on psychokinetics, an action that led to increasing conflict among the membership.

A battle of power ensued in 1962 that resulted in Subud acquiring its own organization and Bennett resigning from the Subud brotherhood and his role as leader of the Coombe Springs Community and Director of Research of the institute.

From 1963, the pattern of exercises that were subsequently followed at Coombe Springs combined the latihan with different techniques such as the Gurdjieff movements. The meeting hall was completed with the fitting of a balcony for viewers and an external access through stairs for spectators. Lectures were held on topics ranging from Sufism to Synchronicity, and Bennett resumed work on the final volumes of his "personal whim", the epic 'The Dramatic Universe', which he had been working on for more than ten years, constantly writing, revising and re-writing.

== Shivapuri Baba ==
Meanwhile, Bennett had made contact with the Shivapuri Baba, a Hindu sage living in Nepal. He had first heard of the Shivapuri Baba in the early 1940s, and now learned from Hugh Ripman (a fellow student of Ouspensky) that the yogi was still alive.

Bennett visited the Shivapuri Baba twice between 1961 and 1963, by which time the Shivapuri Baba was reportedly 137 years old. Bennett was impressed with the vitality and simplicity of the Shivapuri Baba's teaching, and later referred to him as his teacher. Bennett undertook to propagate the Shivapuri Baba's teaching, and made various attempts to incorporate it into his own work.

The Shivapuri Baba died in 1963, shortly after he had approved the draft for his biography, Bennett's Long Pilgrimage - The Life and Teaching of the Shivapuri Baba.

== ISERG ==
In 1962, Bennett gave a seminar on spiritual psychology in which the various elements he had received (particularly from Gurdjieff, Subud and the Shivapuri Baba) were integrated into a coherent psycho-cosmology. This marked a major step in his understanding of a comprehensive methodology which combined both active and receptive "lines of work".

By this time Bennett was also working with a group of young scientists called ISERG (Integral Science Education Research Group) headed by Dr. Anthony Hodgson and soon joined by Anthony George Edward Blake, Kenneth Pledge, Henri Bortoft and others. This group investigated educational methods, the nature of science, and similar subjects. The group maintained a contact with physicist and philosopher David Bohm.

Research fellowships were created to enable Hodgson and Blake to concentrate their time on educational work. Out of this came the idea of structural communication which led the Institute into co-operative work with G.E.C. in the field of teaching machines.

In 1963, Bennett launched the institute's journal, Systematics. The journal was designed to spread the ideas of the discipline of Systematics, a practical analytical method based on his own researches into the laws governing processes in the natural world. The journal ran for 11 years with major contributions from all disciplines.

== Idries Shah ==
While the educational work was progressing, Bennett learned of Idries Shah, an exponent of Sufism. When they met, Shah presented Bennett with a document supporting his claim to represent the "Guardians of the Tradition". Bennett and other followers of Gurdjieff's ideas were astonished to meet a man claiming to represent what Gurdjieff had called "The Inner Circle of Humanity", something they had discussed for so long without hope of its concrete manifestation.

Bennett introduced "teaching stories" to his groups on Shah's instructions. These are now widely published and recognized as important teaching materials containing the essence of Sufi knowledge and insight.

It remained unclear as to what the future relationship between the institute, Bennett and Shah could become. Due to extreme pressure from Shah, Bennett eventually decided to put Coombe Springs at Shah's disposal to do with as he saw fit. In October 1965 at an extraordinary General Meeting of the institute, Bennett persuaded the membership to take this step.

Shah originally indicated that he would take Bennett's psychological groups under his own wing. Bennett welcomed this, as it would allow him to concentrate on research and writing. However, he again found himself unpopular - not only with conservatives within the institute, but also with other followers of Idries Shah and members of his organisation SUFI (Society for the Understanding of the Foundation of Ideas).

In the spring of 1966, The Institute for Comparative Study donated Coombe Springs to Shah, who promptly sold it for a housing development. The Djamee was destroyed. About half the people who had studied under Bennett were integrated into his groups while the rest were left 'in the air'. The institute was left with the educational research work as its main focus. The work with the Hirst Research Laboratories of G.E.C. bore fruit in the new teaching machine, the 'Systemaster', and Bennett organised various young people around him to write and develop teaching materials that followed the structural communication method.

Bennett and some of the Coombe Springs residents had moved into a nearby house in Kingston upon Thames, where the family (the Bennetts now had two sons and two young daughters) would live quietly for four years before Bennett embarked on his last great project - an experimental school for passing on techniques for spiritual transformation.

== International Academy for Continuous Education ==
By 1969 the company which had been formed to explore structural communication – Structural Communication Systems Ltd. – was floundering and Bennett's health, too, was in a dangerous state. After his recovery, Bennett looked afresh at the situation and the conviction came to him that he should take up the work that Gurdjieff had started at the Prieuré in 1923 and been forced to abandon. He would start a School of the Fourth Way.

Bennett became very interested in young people, especially those who surfaced from the social and cultural turmoil of the 1960s with serious questions about the significance of life but with few satisfactory answers. As part of his research, Bennett attended the rock music festival on the Isle of Wight in 1970. The outcome was the establishment of an "academy" to teach some of what he had learned in trying to discover the "sense and aim of life, and of human life in particular."

On the twenty fifth anniversary of the institute, in April 1971, a jubilee celebration on the theme of The Whole Man was held. In a very short time, primarily in the US, Bennett recruited many students and in October 1971 the International Academy for Continuous Education was inaugurated in Sherborne, Gloucestershire.

Bennett had begun this enterprise with no programme in mind and with only a handful of helpers. Initially, his ideas had involved running a school in the midst of 'life-conditions' in Kingston with two dozen students, but contact with a young representative of the New Age Movement in the USA persuaded him to think in terms of larger numbers and a relatively isolated locale in the countryside. Bennett realized that work on the land (which he considered to be an essential part of teaching the proper relationship between mankind and the rest of creation) would require a larger number. Both Hasan Shushud and Idries Shah made recommendations that, for the most part, he disregarded.

He quickly attracted one hundred pupils, and in 1971, with the support of the Institute for Comparative Study, he inaugurated the International Academy for Continuous Education, in the village of Sherborne, Gloucestershire, England.

The name was chosen "to indicate on the one hand its Platonic inspiration and on the other to emphasise that it was to offer a teaching for the whole life of the men and women who came to it."

As he tells the story in his autobiography, although various spiritual leaders had urged him at various points in his life to strike out on his own path, it was not until near the end of his years that he felt fully confident to assume the mantle of the teacher. Bennett relates how Gurdjieff had told him in 1923 that one day Bennett would "follow in his footsteps and take up the work he had started at Fontainebleau." In 1970, following the promptings of a still, small voice from within that said, "You are to found a school",

Bennett proposed that there should be five experimental courses each of ten months duration. The courses proved fruitful, and many people have continued, as he had hoped, to work with the ideas and methods he presented.

In April 1972, the Sufi Hasan Lutfi Shushud (1901-1988) came to stay for a few months at the Academy. Shushud and Bennett had met in Turkey ten years previously, and Shushud had visited Bennett's Surrey home in 1968, at which time he initiated Bennett into his wordless, universal zikr. Bennett concluded that Shushud's wordless universal zikr produced results similar to those of the latihan, while omitting many of the risks attendant on 'opening' people through Subud. Bennett observed that occasionally there are people 'opened' through Subud who experience some harsh and/or dangerous effects (for which they are unprepared) during the operation of the latihan. This observation led him to have reservations about the supposed absolute safety of the latihan for the general public. As a result of these reservations, Bennett became increasingly attracted to the Khwajagan (Masters of Wisdom of Central Asia) as presented in the teachings of Shushud. In 1973 Bennett's publisher Alick Bartholomew commissioned Bennett and Shushud to co-write a book whose tentative title was Gurdjieff and the Masters of Wisdom. Before the book was ready for publication Shushud pulled out of the project, telling Bennett that he did not trust the publisher, apparently on the grounds that Bartholomew had deducted state income tax from the advance payment for the book. However, eventually it became known that what Shushud was really objecting to was Bennett's contention in the book that Gurdjieff had established personal contact with the Khwajagan, and that therefore it is very likely that at least some of Gurdjieff's major teachings are based directly on what he had learned from the Khwajagan. Due to Shushud's disagreements with Bennett over this issue, Bennett ended up dividing the proposed book into two separate books, titled respectively Gurdjieff: Making a New World (1973) and The Masters of Wisdom (1975) (not published until after Bennett's death). However, in spite of Shushud's disagreements with Bennett over this issue, it appears that Bennett nevertheless (in the end) borrowed heavily from Shushud's teachings on the Khwajagan (probably against Shushud's wishes), in order to bring his book on that subject (The Masters of Wisdom) to a successful conclusion.

There are a number of mysterious things about Shushud, who certainly had unusual powers. Bennett makes a brief reference to these in his book Witness, and many others have attested to them. While criticising Bennett's methods, Shushud impressed on him that "Your only home is the Absolute Void". However, Shushud eventually agreed that what Bennett was doing for young Western seekers was more suitable for them than his own strict methods of fasting and zikr.

In the same year (1973), Bennett began editing Gurdjieff's Third Series of writings, Life is Real Only Then When I Am, undertaking its publication on behalf of the Gurdjieff family (who were having difficulties in dealing with the Gurdjieff Foundation). He also revisited Turkey, meeting with Hajji Muzaffer Özak al-Jerrahi (1916–1985), the Grand Shaykh of the Halveti-Jerrahi Sufi Order.

During the period of the second course at the Academy, a Theravada Buddhist monk and teacher from Cambodia named Bhante Dharmawara (1889–1999) came to Sherborne at Bennett's invitation. During his visit Dharmawara introduced meditation techniques that continue to be practised by many people.

Other visitors to the Academy were Süleyman Dede (1904–1985), head of the Mevlevi Order in Konya, as well as Süleyman Dede's disciple Reshad Feild (1934–2016). Idries Shah paid a brief visit during the first year, but soon left, with harsh views on the attitudes and disposition of the students.

Throughout the period of the institute's existence, Bennett had been toying with the idea of founding a spiritual community. He saw the Sermon on the Mount as a document describing the true community. His contact with Idries Shah combined this in his mind with the possibility of establishing a Power House where 'enabling energies' could be concentrated. He set his sights on some kind of self-sufficient community, populated by Sherborne graduates, to evolve out of the school. He was profoundly influenced by contemporary ideas, such as those of Schumacher, about the need for alternative technology and by the argument of conservationists for intelligent, ecologically sound agriculture. He was also greatly impressed that his spiritual hero and inner teacher, Khwaja Ubaidallah Ahrar (15th century) had turned to farming after his period of training.

The soaring price of land in the UK led to Bennett's interest in starting something in the US. In 1974, he signed an agreement whereby the institute loaned $100,000 to a newly formed society for the foundation of a psychokinetic community. He signed this document shortly before his death on 13 December 1974.

The Claymont Society was founded to attempt to carry out Bennett's vision, but without the help of his guidance.

In the summer of 1974, he visited the Maharishi Mahesh Yogi in Rome to question him about Transcendental Meditation and his interpretation of the Bhagavad Gita. Bennett had been initiated into TM several years before and first met the Maharishi in 1959. He disputed Maharishi's presentation of the Gita in which he eliminated the need for sacrifice and suffering.

In the last year of his life, he gradually made it known to those working with him, that his own personal task centred on the creation of a way of religious worship that would be accessible to men and women of the West who were lacking in religious formation. During this period he made experiments with the Islamic namaz and Sufi zikr.

The teachings he developed in his last years were recorded and published in a series of books put together by Anthony Blake. He showed that at last he was independent of Gurdjieff and had his own understanding of the spiritual world, based on a radical questioning of all current assumptions.

Bennett died on Friday 13 December 1974, shortly after the start of the fourth course. That course, and the fifth, were completed by his wife, working with a few of his most experienced pupils.

With his death the institute was faced with the typical problems of a body which had been led almost single-handedly by one man since its inception. The decision was taken to continue the Academy's work until the five-year period, originally specified by Bennett, had been completed. The setting up of the US community at Claymont Court, West Virginia, went ahead.

In the months before he died, Bennett worked to establish an experimental "ideal human society" embodying the methods and ideas that he had developed and derived from Gurdjieff. He made substantial efforts to overcome the rifts that had grown between different groups of Gurdjieff's followers, and was beginning to talk about the development of new forms of worship appropriate for the modern world.

== Bibliography ==
- 1948. Crisis in human affairs. (2e ed. 1951)
- 1949. What Are We Living For? (A critique of western culture)
- 1956. Dramatic Universe, The (A search for a unified vision of reality)
- 1959. Concerning Subud.
- 1961. Christian mysticism and Subud.
- 1962. Approaching Subud; ten talks. And a discussion with Steve Allen.
- 1962. Witness: The Story of a Search (Dharma Book Company, and Hodder & Stoughton) (Autobiography)
- 1964. A Spiritual Psychology (1974, 1999) (a workbook for creating an organ of perception and mode of existence independent from the vagaries of life)
- 1964. Energies: Material, Vital, Cosmic (2e ed. 1989) (exploration of the theory of Universal Energies developed from Gurdjieff's hints)
- 1965. Long Pilgrimage (2e ed. 1983) (The life and teaching of the Shivapuri Baba)
- 1969. Gurdjieff: A Very Great Enigma (The ideas of Gurdjieff and the mystery that surrounded him)
- 1973. Gurdjieff - Making a New World (Biography exploring Gurdjieff's role in bringing ancient wisdom to the West)
- 1974. How We Do Things: The Role of Attention in Spiritual Life (Chapters on Function, Sensitivity, Consciousness, Decision, & Creativity)
- 1974. Sex: the relationship between sex and spiritual development
- 1974. Transformation of man series

Posthumous publications

- 1975. Intimations: Talks with J. G. Bennett at Beshara (talks given to students of Reshad Feild, Bulent Rauf and of the great Sufi Mystic
- 1976. First Liberation, freedom from like and dislike (2002 ed. subtitle: Working with Themes at Sherborne House)
- 1976. Hazard: The Risk of Realization (First book of talks given on ideas found in The Dramatic Universe)
- 1976. Journeys In Islamic Countries (Diaries of Bennetts's search for the sources of Gurdjieff's teachings)
- 1977. Needs Of A New Age Community: Talks on Spiritual Community & Schools compiled by A. G. E. Blake from the unpublished writings and talks of J. G. Bennett. (Includes Bennett's commentaries on 'The Sermon on the Mount')
- 1977. Material objects
- 1978. Creation (Exploration of the idea that man lives in many worlds)
- 1978. Deeper Man (Gurdjieff's ideas applied to the critical condition of 20th century society)
- 1978, Transformation (2003) (The process by which a man can become a 'New Man')
- 1980. Idiots In Paris (1991, 2008) (Diaries of Elizabeth & J. G. Bennett in Paris with Gurdjieff)
- 1983. Spiritual Hunger Of The Modern Child: a series of ten lectures (Bennett, Mario Montessori, A. I. Polack and others on the nature of a child's spirituality)
- 1989. Creative Thinking (1998) (The conditions necessary for creative insight)
- 1989. Sacred Influences: Spiritual Action in Human Life (Essays on the qualities of Life, Nature, Doing, Wisdom, God, and Sacred Images)
- 1993. Elementary Systematics: A Tool for Understanding Wholes (Conceptual tool to find pattern in complexity. A handbook for business)
- 1995. Making A Soul: Human Destiny and the Debt of Our Existence (Instruction based on Bennett's view of the fundamental purpose of human existence)
- 1995. Masters Of Wisdom: An Esoteric History of the Spiritual Unfolding of Life on This Planet (Historical study and a vision of the workings of higher intelligence)
- 2006. Way To Be Free. edited by Anthony Blake (Conversations between Bennett & his students on the difference between work done from the mind and work from essence)
- 2007. Talks On Beelzebub's Tales (From Bennett's talks on Gurdjieff's series 'Beelzebub's Tales to His Grandson'.

== See also ==
- Systematics – study of multi-term systems
