= Goetheanism =

Goetheanism is a term commonly used in the context of anthroposophy and Waldorf education for a holistic oriented science methodology. The scientific works of Johann Wolfgang von Goethe are regarded as the paradigmatic foundation of this methodology. It was theoretically founded by Rudolf Steiner as editor and commentator of Goethe's scientific writings (1883-1897) and as author of an "Epistemology of Goethe's Worldview" (1886). Goetheanist research strives to combine empirical Methodology and holistic understanding of essence, with the aim to overcome the epistemological split between subject and object.

== History and name ==
The word Goetheanism first appears in 1803 in a letter from the Swedish poet and diplomat Karl Gustaf von Brinkman to Goethe. He used it to refer to Goethe's overall devotion to the world. However, this term did not become generally used in the 19th century. In the early 20th century, Rudolf Steiner, the founder of anthroposophy, often spoke of "Goetheanism" in lectures, by which he meant mainly, but not exclusively, the method underlying Goethe's studies of nature. Thus the word became common among anthroposophists. Outside these circles, on the other hand, it is not used to this day, not even by natural scientists who - like the botanist Wilhelm Troll or the zoologist Adolf Portmann - explicitly follow Goethe in terms of methodology.

Even within anthroposophical circles there is no agreement on the meaning of the term "Goetheanism".

Thus the Goetheanist Wolfgang Schad writes: "It is used to denote: a) For example, simply throughout everything that is scientific work in anthroposophical contexts. [...] c) The experimental verification of many of Steiner's statements with the methods of the university natural sciences. d) Any poetic, aesthetically experiencing approach to nature without any claim to science. e) The cultural-scientific contents in art, art history, history, linguistics and literature oriented towards anthroposophy.
f) The arts that have grown out of anthroposophy, such as eurythmy and the organic style in architecture [...]."

In terms of scientific methodology, the term Goetheanist has been coined in more recent times mainly by the Schriften des frühen Goetheanismus edited by Renate Riemeck (c. 1980) and the book series Goetheanistische Naturwissenschaft edited by Wolfgang Schad (1982-1985), which mainly brings together publications by anthroposophical biologists such as Jochen Bockemühl, Andreas Suchantke and Schad himself. In fundamental essays, leading Goetheanists emphasise the close connection of Goetheanism with anthroposophy.

"Only there is, [...] a logic of thought and a logic of life. And he who does not merely delve into Goethe through a logic of thought, but who takes alive Goethe's impulses, which are full of impulses, and now tries to gain from them what can be gained after so many decades have passed over the development of humanity since Goethe's death, will believe [.... ] as he will, that through the living impulses of Goetheanism - if I may use the expression - precisely this Anthroposophy has been able to come into being through the logic of life, through experiencing what lies in Goethe, and through letting grow in a modest way what Goethe had indicated." (Rudolf Steiner)

== Systematics ==
In his main scientific works "Attempt to explain the metamorphosis of plants" (1790) and "On the Theory of Colours" (1810), Goethe developed different approaches. Accordingly, Steiner also distinguished between the knowledge of inorganic and organic nature in his "Basic Lines of an Epistemology of Goethe's World View" (1886). Following on from this, anthroposophically oriented natural scientists formulated the following "systematics" in 1980, which follows the four-limbed conception of man of anthroposophy:

- In the inorganic, thinking is used to order the qualities given to the senses by observation and experiment in such a way that one phenomenon in its states and processes becomes intelligible as a consequence of other phenomena. A distinction is made between essential (necessary for the appearance of the phenomenon) and non-essential (only modifying) conditions. Such a phenomenon, in which an immediately understandable, lawful connection with the essential conditions appears, is an original phenomenon. From such, all relations between further phenomena can be derived and the latter thus understood (proving method). Thus, deriving from the primordial phenomenon of colours (emergence of colour at light, darkness and turbidity) Goethe developed the basis of an optics.

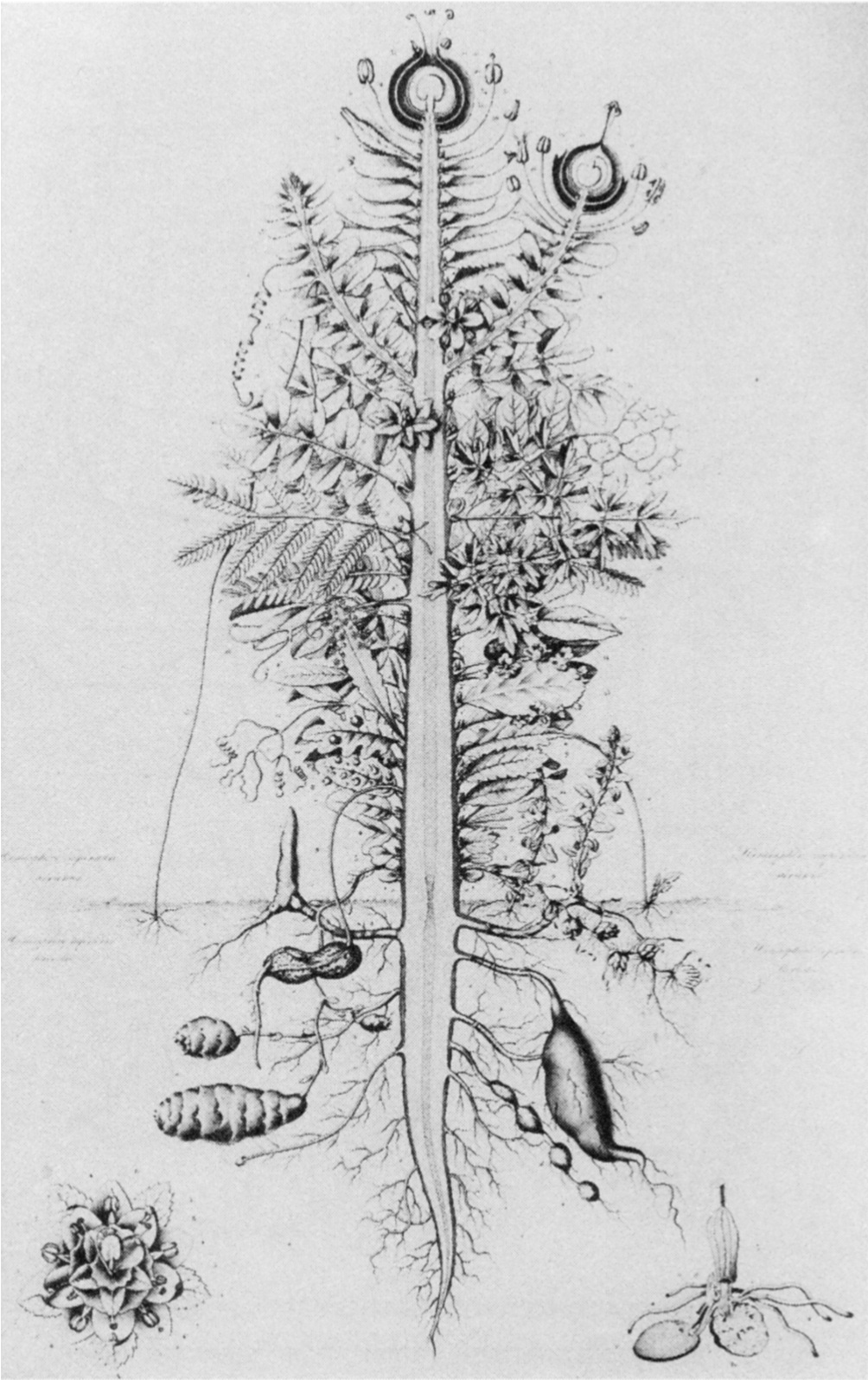
Representation of the original type of plant, or Urpflanze, from 1837, in a woodcut by Pierre Jean François Turpin, who tried to translate Goethe's intuition into a visual image.

- In the organic world the members of the phenomena no longer merely condition each other, but each individual is determined by the whole according to its peculiarity. When studying the processes, it is noticed that the transformation (metamorphosis) of the leaf organs of a plant from the cotyledons to the stem leaves, the sepals, the corolla, the stamens and the carpels is carried out from a basic form (the type); the external conditions have a modifying effect. In the same sense, the different species become intelligible as special manifestations of the genus. This points to a sensuous-sensuous process which, according to the idea, is the same in all plants, but which, according to the appearance, produces different forms both in the individual plant and in the whole plant kingdom and which Goethe called the Urpflanze (the general type of plant). From this, according to Goethe, plants can be invented into infinity, which must be consistent and have an inner truth and necessity (developing method).
- In contrast to the plant, the animal develops a mental inner life that manifests itself outwardly in the instinct and drive-bound self-mobility; in addition, the human being consciously participates in the spiritual in his inner being. In connection with this, the change of animal and human forms, in contrast to the change of plant forms, contains essential leaps, which are caused, among other things, by inversion. (e. e.g. in the formation of the internal organs) or inversion, e. e.g. of tubular bones into the bones of the skull, can be understood. The developing method is thus extended to the inversion method, with the help of which, among other things, the tripartite structure of the animal and human organism, consisting of nerve-sense organs, rhythmic organs and organs of metabolism, is explored beginning with the embryonic development.
- In contrast to the animal, in the corporeality of the human being, the effects of the sensory nervous system, which is permeated by processes of death, and of the system of metabolism and limbs, which is in the process of building up, are mediated by an independent rhythmic system (heart, circulatory system, and respiratory system), which momentarily rekindles the momentarily paralysed life, in such a way that they become the physiological basis of thinking, willing and feeling; through these soul-activities, human individuality can continue its own development. From these connections, Goetheanism attempts to understand and shape the social organism in its Social threefolding into spiritual, legal and economic life.

This system, however, was rather programmatic in character and is not generally accepted among Goetheanists.

== Goethe quotes ==
"A phenomenon, an experiment can prove nothing; it is the link of a great chain which is only valid in the context. He who would cover a string of pearls and show only the most beautiful one by one, demanding that we should believe him that the rest are all like it, would hardly enter into the bargain." (Sprüche in Prosa 160, Maximen und Reflexionen 501.)

"No phenomenon explains itself in and of itself; only many surveyed together, methodically ordered, give at last something that could be considered theory." (Sprüche in Prosa 161, Maximen und Reflexionen 500.)

"The highest thing would be to understand that everything factual is already theory. The blueness of the sky reveals to us the fundamental law of chromatics. Only do not look for anything behind the phenomena; they themselves are the teaching." (Sprüche in Prosa 165, Maximen und Reflexionen 488.)

"There is a tender empiricism which makes itself intimately identical with the object, and thereby becomes theory proper. But this heightening of the intellectual faculty belongs to a highly educated age." (Sprüche in Prosa 167, Maximen und Reflexionen 509.)

"The opinion of the most excellent men and their example gives me hope that I am on the right path, and I wish that my friends, who sometimes ask me what my intention is in my optical endeavours, may be satisfied with this explanation. My intention is: to gather all experience in this subject, to make all experiments myself and to carry them out through their greatest diversity, by which means they are also easy to imitate and are not out of the field of vision of so many people. Then set up the sentences in which the experiences of the higher kind can be expressed, and wait to see to what extent these also rank themselves under a higher principle." (Essay: The Experiment as Mediator of Object and Subject.)

"... for nature alone becomes comprehensible when one endeavours to present the most diverse phenomena, which seem isolated, in methodical succession; since one then well learns to understand that there is no first and last, but that everything, enclosed in a living circle, instead of contradicting itself, clarifies itself and presents the most delicate relations to the inquiring mind." (Goethe, Letters. To Joseph Sebastian Grüner, Weimar, 15 March 1832.)

== See also ==
- Goetheanum
- Goethian science

== Literature ==
- Jochen Bockemühl: Goethes naturwissenschaftliche Methode unter dem Aspekt der Verantwortungsbildung. Elemente der Naturwissenschaft. (Goethe's scientific method under the aspect of responsibility formation. Elements of Natural Science), Vol. 38, 1983, pp. 50–52.
- Jochen Bockemühl: Die Fruchtbarkeit von Goethes Wissenschaftsansatz in der Gegenwart. Elemente der Naturwissenschaft. (The fruitfulness of Goethe's scientific approach in the present. Elements of Natural Science), Vol. 61, 1994, pp. 52–69.
- Henri Bortoft: Goethes naturwissenschaftliche Methode (Goethe's scientific method). Stuttgart 1995, ISBN 3-7725-1544-4.
- Thomas Göbel: Erfahrung mit Idee durchtränken – Goethes naturwissenschaftliche Arbeitsmethode. Aufsatz in Natur und Kunst (Experience imbued with idea - Goethe's scientific working method. Essay in Nature and Art) (pp. 13–24), Stuttgart 1998, ISBN 3-7725-1748-X.
- Peter Heusser (ed.): Goethes Beitrag zur Erneuerung der Naturwissenschaften. Das Buch zur gleichnamigen Ringvorlesung an der Universität Bern. Bern/Stuttgart/Vienna 2000, ISBN 3-258-06083-5.
- Ernst-Michael Kranich: Goetheanismus – seine Methode und Bedeutung in der Wissenschaft des Lebendigen. Elemente der Naturwissenschaft (Goetheanism - its Method and Significance in the Science of the Living). Elemente der Naturwissenschaft, Vol. 86, 2007, pp. 31–45.
- Wolfgang Schad (ed.): Goetheanistische Naturwissenschaft (Goetheanistic Natural Science) (4 vols.). Stuttgart 1982-1985
- Wolfgang Schad (1987): Der Goetheanistische Forschungsansatz und seine Anwendung auf die ökologische Problematik des Waldsterbens (The Goetheanistic Research Approach and its Application to the Ecological Problem of Forest Dieback). In G. R. Schnell (ed.): Waldsterben, Stuttgart, ISBN 3-7725-0549-X.
- Wolfgang Schad: Was ist Goetheanismus? (What is Goetheanism?) Tycho de Brahe-Jahrbuch für Goetheanismus 2001, pp. 23–66, ISBN 3-926347-23-6. reprinted in Die Drei, issue 5–7, 2002.
- Jost Schieren: Anschauende Urteilskraft. Die philosophischen und methodischen Grundlagen von Goethes naturwissenschaftlichem Erkennen. Düsseldorf/Bonn 1998, ISBN 3-930450-27-5.
- Rudolf Steiner: Grundlinien einer Erkenntnistheorie der Goetheschen Weltanschauung. GA no. 2, 1886, ISBN 3-7274-6290-6.
- Rudolf Steiner: Goethes Weltanschauung (Goethe's World View.) GA no. 6, 1897, ISBN 3-7274-6250-7.
- Andreas Suchantke: Metamorphose. Kunstgriff der Evolution (Metamorphosis. Artifice of Evolution.) Stuttgart 2002, ISBN 3-7725-1784-6.
- Andreas Suchantke: Goetheanismus als „Erdung“ der Anthroposophie (Goetheanism as the "grounding" of anthroposophy). In: Die Drei. Issues 2 and 3, 2006
