= Wolfgang Schad =

German evolutionary biologist (1935–2022)

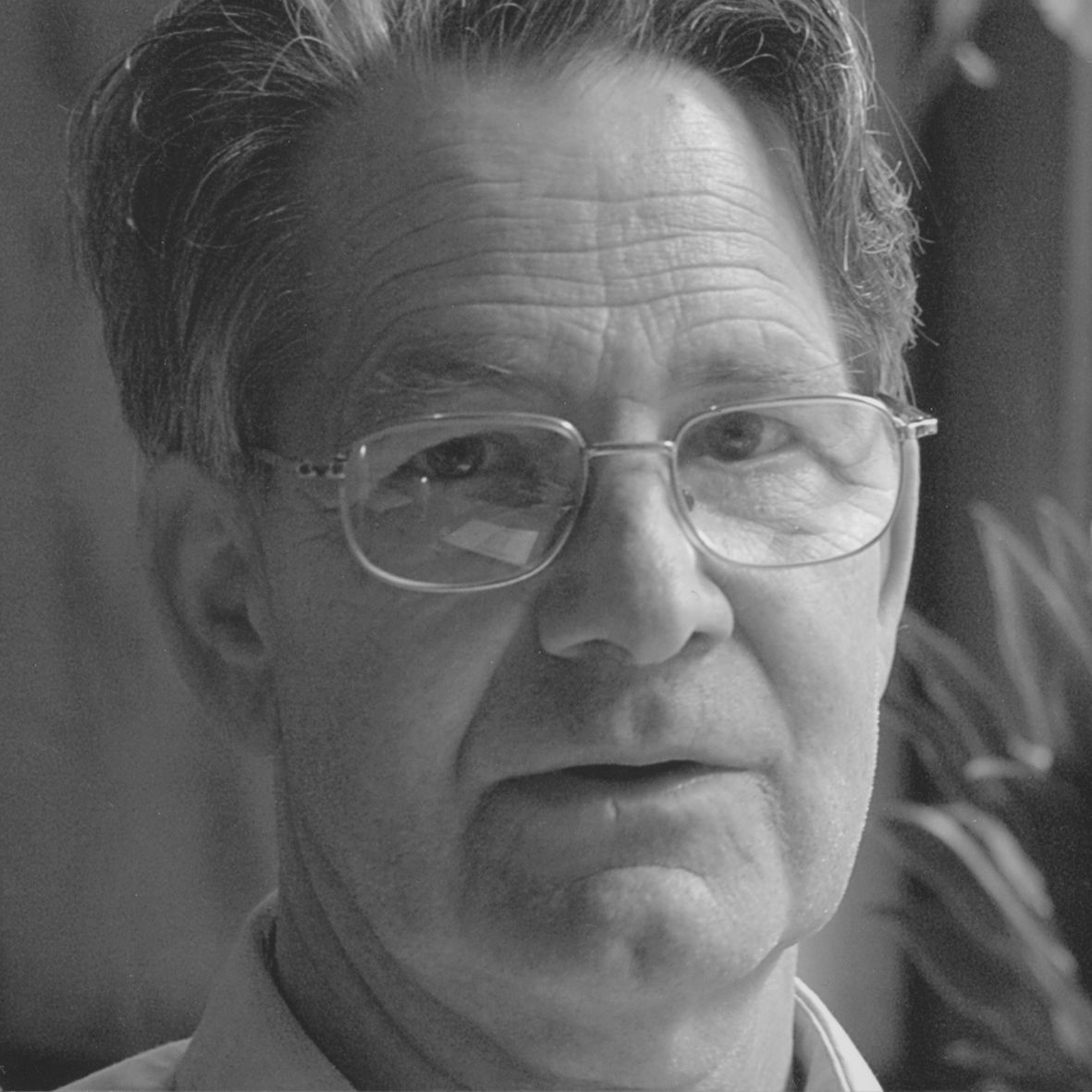
- Born: 27 July 1935; Biberach an der Riß, Baden-Württemberg, Germany
- Died: 15 October 2022 (aged 87); Witten, North Rhine-Westphalia, Germany
- Occupation: Evolutionary biologist

Wolfgang Schad (27 July 1935 – 15 October 2022) was a German evolutionary biologist, anthroposophist and goetheanist.

== Life ==
Schad studied biology, chemistry, physics and education. In the early years of his professional career, he was a teacher at Waldorf schools. After many years as a Waldorf teacher at the Goetheschule in Pforzheim, Wolfgang Schad became a lecturer at the Seminar for Waldorf Education at the Freie Hochschule Stuttgart in 1975. In addition, he was a member of staff at the Educational Research Centre of the Bund der Freien Waldorfschulen in Stuttgart, which he temporarily directed.

In 1992 he founded the Institute for Evolutionary Biology and Morphology at Witten/Herdecke University, which he directed until 2005. The foundation of the chair was supported by the patron Karl Ludwig Schweisfurth, after whom the institute was named.

His son Albrecht Schad also became a Waldorf teacher and, after his father's departure, also a lecturer at the Freie Hochschule Stuttgart in the training for teachers at Waldorf schools.

After Wolfgang Schad had retired Bernd Rosslenbroich has taken over as head of the institute.

== Scientific work ==
His major two-volume work Threefoldness in Humans and Mammals: Toward a Biology of Form (Adonis Press, 2020) is an expanded second edition of his book Man and Mammals, first published in 1977. In Threefoldness in Humans and Mammals, Schad applied Rudolf Steiner’s approach from his idea of the threefold structure of the human organism in the sense of a comparative morphology to mammals.

From 1982 to 1985 Schad published four anthologies of works by various authors under the title Goetheanist Natural Science in the (anthroposophical) Verlag Freies Geistesleben & Urachhaus. With this he established the term Goetheanism in the environment of anthroposophy. Numerous works by Schad appeared in anthroposophical journals, only occasionally did he write for others. As head of the Institute of Evolutionary Biology, he became editor of the Wissenschaftlichen Schriftenreihe des Instituts für Evolutionsbiologie und Morphologie Universität Witten/Herdecke (Scientific Series of the Institute of Evolutionary Biology and Morphology University of Witten/Herdecke).

In his research in evolutionary biology, Schad came to the conclusion that evolutionary developments would not take place by coincidence alone, but also not by teleology, but that in many living beings there would live a piece of inner autonomy, which, if the epigenetic changes are inherited by their offspring, could lead them to new forms of development.

"The element of chance frees the course of evolution from the teleological determinism of any plan. In the meantime, quantum and chaos theory have also freed it from the causal determinism in its claim to absoluteness." (Wolfgang Schad, 2009)

His central topics include the temporal shapes in the evolution of animals and humans and heterochrony. In retirement, he authored several more books published by Urachhausverlag.

== See also ==
- Hermann Poppelbaum
- Adolf Portmann

== Selected publications ==
- Man and mammals: Toward a Biology of Form. Verlag: Waldorf Press, 1977, ISBN 978-0-91461-410-4
- Heterochronical patterns of evolution in the transitional stages of vertebrate classes. In: Acta Biotheoretica. Vol. 41, pages 383–389. 1993. DOI:10.1007/bf00709372
- Moon Rhythms in Nature: How Lunar Cycles Affect Living Organisms. Floris Books, 2003, ISBN 978-0863153600
- Understanding Mammals: Threefoldness and Diversity. Adonis Press, 2018, ISBN 978-0932776631
- Threefoldness in Humans and Mammals: Toward a Biology of Form. Adonis Press, 2020, ISBN 978-0932776648
