= Rodney Collin =

British writer (1909–1956)

- Born: Rodney George Collin-Smith; 26 April 1909; Brighton and Hove, England
- Died: 3 May 1956 (aged 47); Cusco Cathedral, Cusco, Peru
- Education: Ashford School; London School of Economics
- Occupations: Writer; journalist; spiritualist
- Spouse: Janet Buckley (m. 1934; died 1971)
- Relatives: Joyce Collin-Smith (sister-in-law)

Rodney George Collin-Smith (26 April 1909 – 3 May 1956), known as Rodney Collin, was a British writer who focused on the area of spiritual development. His work was heavily influenced by his teacher P. D. Ouspensky and, through him, G. I. Gurdjieff and the thought system associated with them. His best known work, The Theory of Celestial Influence, is an ambitious attempt to unite astronomy, physics, chemistry, human physiology and world history with his own version of planetary influences.

== Early life ==
Collin was born in Brighton and Hove, England, on 26 April 1909. He was the son of Frederick Collin-Smith, a wine merchant. Collin attended Ashford School in Kent, where he was a boarder, and then the London School of Economics, where he received his Bachelor of Commerce degree.

Collin worked as a journalist for the Evening Standard and the Sunday Referee on the subject of art and travel. He met his future wife Janet Buckley in 1930 on a pilgrimage organised by the international Christian movement Toc H. Collin read Ouspensky's A New Model of the Universe for the first time the same year.

In 1935, Collin and Buckley attended several lectures given by Scottish author Maurice Nicoll in London. After meeting Ouspensky in September 1936, Collin reached an instant euphoria: he had found what he had been looking for in his extensive reading and travelling. Fellow Toc H member Robert de Ropp was likely a source for Collin's and Buckley's interest in the Work ideas. The influence of Ouspensky is indisputable; his and Collin's approaches seem inseparable.

== Writing career ==
=== The Fourth Way ===
Within Collin's most relevant contributions, it is the emphasis on the idea of Fourth Way school existing in different times. He says:

Schools of the fourth way have existed and exist, just as schools of the three traditional ways existed and exist. But they are much more difficult to detect, because - unlike the others - they cannot be recognized by any one practice, one method, one task, or one name. They are always inventing new methods, new practices, suitable to the time and conditions in which they exist, and when they have achieved one task which was set them they pass on to another, often changing their name and whole appearance in the process.

Collin studied the sequence of European civilizations, finding a pattern that would follow a planetary scale where the durations are 10 times longer than a human life. His sequence starts following that of Arnold J. Toynbee in A Study of History, but soon he changes some aspects, trying to follow his said pattern. Thus, his list begins with the Greeks (with roots in the Egyptian, which he considers the last one in the previous sequence), then the Romans, the Primitive Christians, the Monastic Christians, the Medieval Christians, the Renaissance and the Synthetic. He also quotes the influence of an extra-European civilization, the Arabic, upon the Medieval Christian civilization.

Collin established a relation between Fourth Way schools and the origin and development of these civilizations. He says:

Thus schools of the fourth way were undoubtedly behind the designing and construction of the great Gothic cathedrals, though they had no special name and adapted themselves to the religious organization of the time. For a time the Cluniacs sheltered them, for a time the Freemasons. In the seventeenth century, similar schools were responsible for much of the new scientific and medical research, sometimes under one name and sometimes under another. In the eighteenth century again, fourth way schools borrowed many of the discoveries of Greek and Egyptian archeology to clothe their ideas and their organization, while some of their leaders – in order to penetrate the luxury-loving and sophisticated circles where they had work to do – might even appear in the guise of fashionable magicians or mesmerists.

The conceptual foundations for this project are the Law of Three, arguably similar to the triad of Thesis, antithesis, synthesis of Georg Wilhelm Friedrich Hegel, and the Law of Seven, the idea that the notes of the Western musical scale encode universal stages in essentially all developmental processes. Collin unites both of these schemata geometrically using the enneagram figure.His master, Peter Ouspensky, claimed to have heard from Gurdjieff that "the Enneagram is the symbol of perpetual motion." Furthermore, that people are different because they receive different planetary energies. This is in the book "Fragments of an Unknown Teaching." Collin was the first to unite these two ideas: perpetual motion (i.e., planets in the Solar System) and typology, presenting his Typological Enneagram, which divided all people in existence into 7 human types of essence, according to the greatest influence of the planet in question. This Enneagram precedes Ichazo's Enneagram, dating back to 1952, as published in Rodney Collin's book, "El Desarrollo de La Luz" ("The Development of Light").

=== Other work ===
Collin's other work includes The Theory of Eternal Life, which uses some of the ideas of The Theory of Celestial Influence as a point of departure to formulate a theory of the cycles and potentials of souls, e.g. reincarnation. His works The Theory of Conscious Harmony and The Mirror of Light are more spiritual explorations of humanity: faith, acceptance and forgiveness in contrast to the philosophical scope of his earlier works.

=== Mexico ===
In 1948, Collin, his wife Janet and several students of Ouspensky who decided to follow him, moved to the Tlalpan suburb of Mexico City. They lived there for two years. His book The Theory of Eternal Life was published anonymously in 1949, the same year in which he wrote the play Hellas, which represents the various stages of Greek civilization. In all this time Collin did not stop working on the book The Theory of Celestial Influence, which was published in Spanish in 1953, and in English in 1954.

In 1949, Rodney and Janet Collin purchased a plot of land in the mountains outside the city of Mexico City, where in 1951 the foundation was laid for the planetarium Tetecala, which in Aztec means "Stone House of God". This building occupied a central place in the work of Rodney and people close to him throughout the following years. There were theatrical performances of esoteric mysteries, as well as meetings of Rodney Collin's groups.

In the spring of 1954, a group including Collin, under the name of "The Unicorn Actors", gave twelve public performances of Henrik Ibsen's Per Gunnet (Peer Gynt) for the residents of the town of Tlalpan. Collin played the role of Button Caster. He travelled to Europe and the Middle East in 1954 and 1955, the main purpose of which was to collect material and establish links with the esoteric schools of the past. During his visit to Rome in 1954 he was accepted into the Roman Catholic Church. Collin pondered this step for a long time. With the help of Catholicism, he wanted to attract more people interested in the esoteric side of Christianity into his work. The choice in favor of Catholicism was not accidental, given that it was the most popular religion in the countries of South America.

As a result of the distribution of books by Ediciones Sol in Latin America, Collin's groups began to appear in Peru, Chile, Argentina and Uruguay, and contacts were established in several other countries of the American continent. In January 1955, Rodney visited groups in Lima and Buenos Aires, and then went to Cusco and Machu Picchu to study the remains of ancient civilizations.

== Death and legacy ==
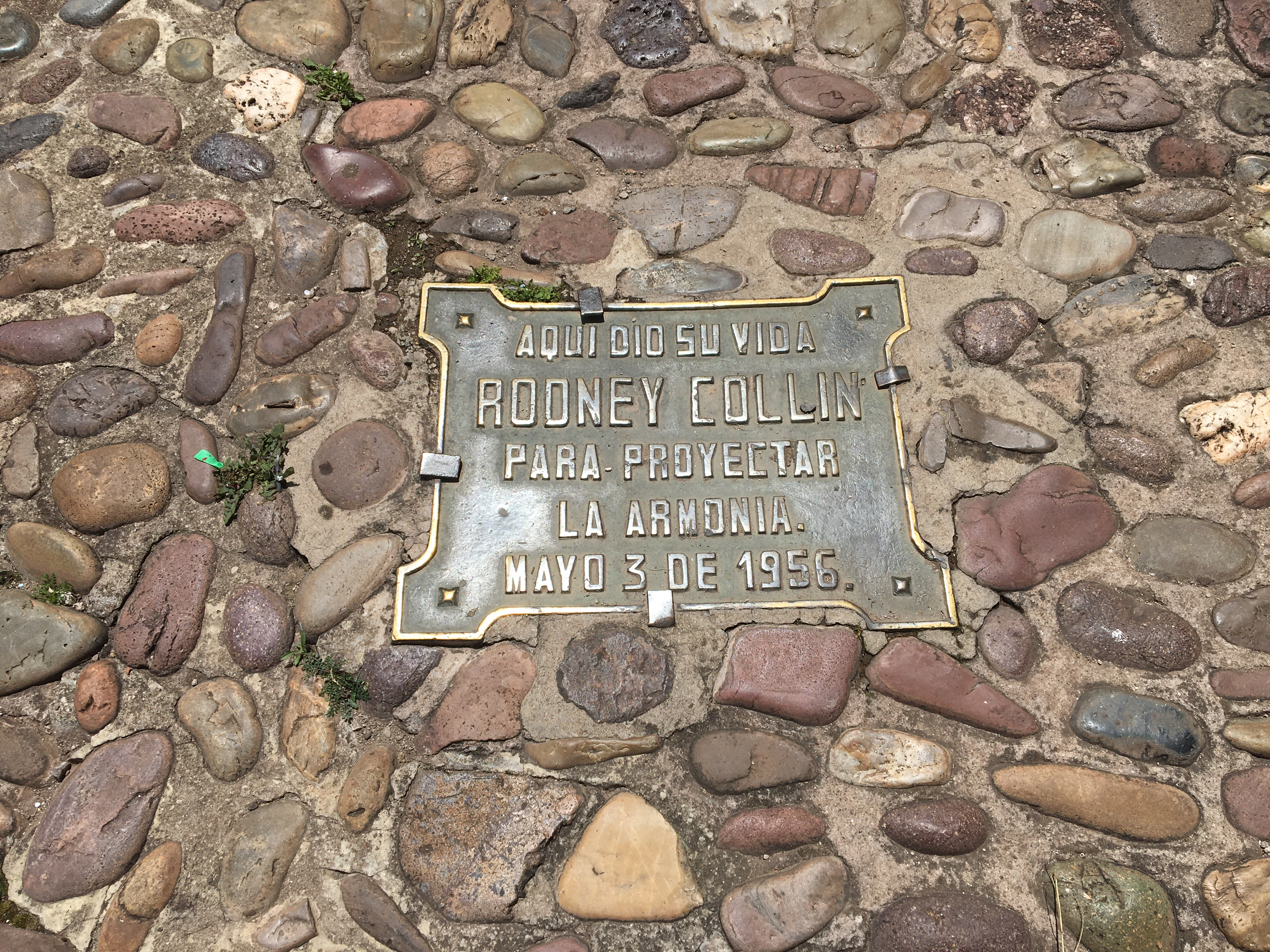
Memorial plaque for Collin in Cusco

In January 1956, Collin led an all-night foot procession 48 kilometers long to the place of worship of Our Lady of Guadalupe. During Mass in the Basilica, he fainted from exhaustion, although it later became clear that this was the first of several heart attacks from which he died in Peru on 3 May 1956. He fell off the bell tower of the Cusco Cathedral while having a heart attack.

Collin's remains were placed in an old church wall in Cuzco. On a flat stone is written the prayer he wrote one month before he died:

I was in the presence of God,
He sent me to earth,
I lost my wings,
My body entered matter,
My soul was fascinated,
Earth drew me down,
I reached the depth.
I am inert,
Longing arises,
I gather my strength,
Will is created,
I receive and meditate,
I adore the Trinity,
I am in the presence of God.

A memorial plaque for Collin has been placed by the bell tower at the Plaza de Armas in Cusco.

== Publications ==
- Palms and Patios
- The Theory of Eternal Life, 1949
- Hellas
- The Development of Light, 1952
- The Theory of Celestial Influence, London: Vincent Stuart, 1954
- The Christian Mystery
- The Herald of Harmony
- The Mysteries of the Seeds
- The Pyramid of Fire
- The Whirling Ecstacy
- A Programme of Study
- The Theory of Conscious Harmony, 1958
- Mirror of Light, London: Vincent Stuart, 1959
