= Mohammad Amin Sheikho =

Islamic scholar

- Born: 1890
- Died: 1964 (aged 73–74)
- Known for: Interpretation of the Quran

Mohammad Amin Sheikho (Arabic: محمد أمين شيخو, 1890 - 1964) was an Islamic scholar and interpreter of the Quran.

== Early life and education ==
Sheikho was born in the al-Ward district of the Sarouja Quarter in Damascus, Syria. After the death of Sheikho's father, Mohammad Saleem, Sheikho's older and only brother, was appointed as the director of the Military School during Ottoman rule.

In 1902, at the age of twelve, he was enrolled at the Al-Rashidiya School. He then went on to complete his studies at Amber, the Royal Ottoman Faculty in Damascus. Sheikho earned certificates of commendation and praise during the Ottoman rule, as well as under the reign of King Faisal of Syria, copies of which still exist to this day.

== Career ==
=== Public administration ===
During the period of Turkish rule, he served as the head of many police stations in Damascus and its dependent counties. During the French Mandate for Syria and Lebanon, he was appointed as a director of the prisons of the Citadel of Damascus.

When the Great Syrian Revolt took place against the French forces, he assisted the Syrian revolutionaries in their attempts to overthrow French rule. Due to his activities, the French governor of Syria issued an order for his execution.

=== Academic career ===
He was the companion of Sheikh Mohammed Amin Kuftaro for twenty years. Following Kuftaro's death, Sheikho became the next in succession to guide and teach his disciples. In 1953, the British philosopher Sir John G. Bennett visited him for three weeks to discuss Islam. Bennett asked Sheikho many questions about the exact definition of the ‘spirit’ and the difference between that and the ‘soul’, as well as seeking for clarification about Godly Justice, a topic which he found difficult to comprehend. As a result of this visit, Bennett practiced Islamic legislation and performed the prayers along with Sheikho's followers.

== Publications ==
Mohammad Amin Sheikho authored books about Islam in Arabic, a few have been translated into English and French.

- The Envoy of Peace Looms on the Horizon: the Return of Jesus Christ.
