= Goethean science =

Philosophy of Johann Wolfgang von Goethe

Goethean science concerns the natural philosophy (German Naturphilosophie "philosophy of nature") of German writer Johann Wolfgang von Goethe. Although primarily known as a literary figure, Goethe did research in morphology, anatomy, and optics. He also developed a phenomenological approach to natural history, an alternative to Enlightenment natural science, which is still debated today among scholars.

His works in natural history include his 1790 Metamorphosis of Plants and his 1810 book Theory of Colors. His work in colour, and his polemics against the Newtonian Optics had a mixed reception from the natural history establishment of the time — under half spoke against Goethe, while a third of natural scientists had favourable reviews of Goethe's colour theory.

== Background ==
The rationalist scientific method, which had worked well with inert nature (Bacon's natura naturata), was less successful in seeking to understand vital nature (natura naturans). At the same time, the rational-empirical model based on the predominance of mentative thinking (German: sinnen) via the intellect (German: Sinn), started by Descartes and advanced most notably in France, was leading to confusion and doubt rather than clarity. Especially in subjective topics, equally rational arguments could be made for widely divergent propositions or conceptions.

The more empirical approach favored in Britain (Hume) had led to viewing reality as sense-based, including the mind; however, what we perceive is only a mental representation of what is real, and what is real we can never really know, according to Immanuel Kant's theory of appearance (Schein) and the thing-in-itself (Ding-an-sich).

As one observer summarizes, there were two 'games' being played in philosophy at the time – one rational and one empirical, both of which led to total skepticism and an epistemological crisis.

== The Kantian problem ==
Immanuel Kant in Prussia undertook a major rescue operation to preserve the validity of knowledge derived via reason (science), as well as of knowledge going beyond the rational mind, that is of human liberty and of life beyond simply an expression of 'the chance whirlings of unproductive particles' (Coleridge). Kant's writings had an immediate and major impact on Western philosophy and triggered a philosophical movement known as German idealism (Fichte, Hegel, Schelling), which sought to overcome and transcend the chasm Kant had formalized between the sense-based and the super-sensible worlds, in his attempt to 'save the appearances' (Owen Barfield), that is, to preserve the validity of scientific or rational knowledge as well as that of faith.

Kant's solution was an epistemological dualism: we cannot know the thing-in-itself (Das Ding an Sich) beyond our mental representation of it. While there is a power (productive imagination – produktive Einbildungskraft) that produces a unity ("transcendental unity of apperception"), we cannot know or experience it in itself; we can only see its manifestations and create representations about it in our mind. The realm beyond the senses also could not be known via reason, but only via faith. To seek to know the realm beyond the senses amounts to what Kant termed an 'adventure of reason'.

== Goethe's Scientific Approach ==
=== Classification, Causation, and Laws of Nature ===
The science editor for the Kurschner edition of Goethe's works, Rudolf Steiner, describes three ways in which Goethe's approach to Science differs from analytic modern science in The Light Course:

I) Classification: First scientists divide and classify the beings and phenomena of Nature. From individual creatures and phenomena, they form concepts of species, kind and genus. This summing of external sensory impressions of many individual wolves and hyenas into kinds and species is already taken unconsciously for granted. No one reflects they should Examine how these general ideas are epistemologically related to the single data.

II) Causation: The second thing modern scientists do, is that by means of experiment, they try to arrive at what are called the 'causes' of phenomena. The forces of electricity, of magnetism, of heat or warmth. In trying to go back to the Causes of Phenomena — Science always goes from what is Known into the Unknown [in a Kantian Critical sense]. Is it really justified when we perceive a phenomenon of light or colour, to say that what we subjectively describe as the quality of colour is the effect on us of an objective process taking place as a wave-movement? To distinguish between the 'subjective' event and the 'objective' — the latter being the wave-movement, or the interaction thereof with processes in ponderable matter.

III) Laws of Nature: A third way scientists get at the configuration of Nature is by Summing up phenomena into 'Laws of Nature'. Kepler's Law of elliptical orbits, or Netwon's Law of Gravitation — where every body attracts every other body proportionally to their mass and inversely to the square of the distance between their centres.

In these three ways "scientific research" tries to get near to Nature. Now I will emphasize at the very outset that the Goethean outlook upon Nature strives for the very opposite in all three respects.

— Rudolf Steiner

=== Goethe's approach to vital nature ===
In relation to Goethe's Colour Theory — Ernst Lehrs writes, "In point of fact, the essential difference between Goethe's theory of colour and the theory which has prevailed in science (despite all modifications) since Newton's day, lies in this: While the theory of Newton and his successors was based on excluding the colour-seeing faculty of the eye, Goethe founded his theory on the eye's experience of colour."

"The renouncing of life and immediacy, which was the premise for the progress of natural science since Newton, formed the real basis for the bitter struggle which Goethe waged against the physical optics of Newton. It would be superficial to dismiss this struggle as unimportant: there is much significance in one of the most outstanding men directing all his efforts to fighting against the development of Newtonian optics." (Werner Heisenberg, during a speech celebrating Goethe's birthday)

Goethe undertook his 'adventure of reason', starting with the "crisis" in botany, the merely and purely mechanical classification-taxonomy of plant life. In so doing, Goethe also "wagered a sweeping theory about Nature itself."

Goethe was concerned with the narrowing specialization in science and emphasis on accumulating data in a merely mechanical manner, devoid of human values and human development. Linnaean botanic taxonomic system represented this in his day, a Systema naturae. Goethe intuited the practice of rational science promoted a narrowing and contracting interplay between humanity and nature. For Goethe, any form of science based only upon physical-material characteristics and then only selected external traits, led to epistemic impoverishment and a reduction of human knowledge.

What was needed was increased ability to derive meaning from voluminous external data by looking at it from both external-sensory angles, and from an internal angle where thinking, feeling, intuition, imagination, and inspiration could all contribute to conclusions reached by the experimenter.

Linnaean taxonomy was already coming under criticism from Comte de Buffon, who argued the mechanistic classification of the outer forms of nature (natura naturata) needed to be replaced by a study of the interrelation of natural forces and natural historical change.

For Goethe, the collection of new knowledge is inseparable from a Geschichte des Denkens und Begreifens, a history of thinking and conceptualization. Knowledge is also about association, not only about separation, as Coleridge also explained in his Essays on Method (see Romantic epistemology).

While arranging material phenomena in logical linear sequence is a valid scientific method, it had to be carried out under a correct and humanistic organizing idea (Bacon's lumen siccum), itself grounded in nature, or natural law, often boundaried by multiple, lawful pairs of polarity.

Goethe proposed experimenters seek the natural, lawful organizing ideas or archetype behind specific natural phenomena. Phase One was to immerse one's self in a living interaction with the natural phenomena to be studied, with all available senses. Goethe valued "the labor of experimentation".

This contrasted greatly with a trend in rational Natural Science to 'abandon' nature itself and formulate an abstract hypothesis; then, experiment to test whether your hypothesis can be verified. Goethe considered this an 'artificial experience' which 'tears' individual manifestations out of the meaningful context of the whole (e.g., Newton's color hypothesis).

Instead, Goethe's experimenter must adopt a more living, more humane, approach aspiring to enter into the living essence of nature, as perceived in the phenomenon studied.

For Goethe, success meant penetrating to the crucial, underlying, sensorily-invisible archetype-pattern: the Ur-phänomen. The Experimenter aspires to allow the phenomena to reveal its inherent order and lawfulness. While often invisible, this lawfulness is clearly objective, not subjective, and not invented by the experimenter (see Goethe's description of a dandelion, or Steiner's copied version).

Ernst Lehrs went further in emphasizing how all objective manifestation comes from the movement of physical-material objects as motion comes to rest (Man or Matter, 3rd ed. preferred).

Goethean Science stands apart from Cartesian-Newtonian Science in its alternative value system. Regarding quantification, Goethean Science is nonetheless rigorous as to experimental method and the matter of qualities.

The German philosopher and mystic Rudolf Steiner, who was at one point an assistant editor of the standard edition of Goethe's works, applied Goethe's methodology of a living approach to nature to the performing and fine arts. This gives Anthroposophic visual and performing arts their air of going beyond the mere outer form of things (natura naturata) to discern a more inner nature (natura naturans). Steiner hoped to relate the human sphere with all of Nature through the arts; including, the art of Goethean Science.

When composing his magnum opus, Oswald Spengler acknowledged his enormous debt to Goethe for providing him with the necessary inspiration and guidance, such that he devoted two chapters to describing and explaining Goethe's 'organic' logic - which demands life-experience (rather than the scientific experience associated with inorganic logic). The former consists of "letting the impressions of the world just work upon your senses, enabling you to absorb those impressions as a whole".

== Goethe's ur-phenomena ==
Five arts was Goethe's method of transmuting his observation of human nature into sharable form. Drawing from his novel, Elective Affinities (Wahlverwandschaften), Goethe discerned a geheime Verwandschaft (hidden relationship) of parts that explains how one form can transform into another form while being part of an underlying archetypal form (Ur-phänomen).

It is this organizing idea or form that guides the consideration of the parts; it is a Bild or virtual image that "emerges and re-emerges from the interaction of experience and ideas". This consideration is a special type of thinking (noetic ideation or denken) carried out with a different organ of cognizance to that of the brain (mentation or sinnen), one that involves an act of creative imagination, what Goethe terms "the living imaginal beholding of Nature" (das lebendige Anschauen der Natur). Goethe's nature (natura naturans, the activity of "nature naturing" – as distinguished from natura naturata, "nature natured", the domain of naturally formed objects) is one in constant flux and flow, but nonetheless governed by law, logic and intelligence above the mind. To approach vital nature requires a different cognitive capacity (denken) and cognitive organ (Gemüt) from that used to perceive inert nature (sinnen based on the Intellect or Sinn).

== Experiment as interactive experience ==
In his 1792 essay "The experiment as mediator between subject and object", Goethe developed an original philosophy of science, which he used in his research. The essay underscores his experiential standpoint. "The human being himself, to the extent he makes sound use of his senses, is the most exact physical apparatus that can exist."

While the fixed Linnaean system, like classical physics, its distinctions broke down increasingly at the border, reflected in the increasing confusion as to how to classify the growing number of plant forms being brought forward. This led to greater division rather than greater unity. Goethe's discovery of an underlying order directly challenged the fixed, static view of nature of the Linnaean taxonomy (based on artificial types arrived at by choosing certain features and ignoring others), but also the tendency of natural science to study vital nature by means of the methodology used on inert nature (physics, chemistry).

The Cartesian-Newtonian method presupposes separation between observer and observed. Goethe considered this a barrier. As Wellmon observes, Goethe's concept of science is one in which "not only the object of observation changes and moves but also the subject of observation." Thus, a true science of vital nature would be based on an approach that was itself vital, dynamic, labile. The key for this is a living, direct, interactive experience (Erlebnis) involving the mind, but also higher faculties more participatory and Imaginative (Gemüt), not dissociative and separative (Sinn).

Only since the 1970s have other mainstream scientists come to be interested in Goethe's more holistic-humanistic approach to experiments.

In his study on color (Farbenlehre), Goethe challenged the view observers can look devoid and naive of theoretical context; likewise, challenging the assumption of shared common neutral language in science research and innovation. Rather Goethe believed every act of looking at a thing turns into observation, every act of observation turns into mentation, every act of mentation turns into associations. Thus it is evident we theorize every time we look attentively out into the world." In support of Goethe, Feyerabend wrote: "Newton... did not give the explanation [of light] but simply re-described what he saw...[and] introduced the machinery of the very same theory he wanted to prove."

For Goethe, the ultimate aim of science was two-fold, both increase to the database of human knowledge; second, as a method for the metamorphosis of the experimenter. In Goethean Science, experiment is the 'mediator between object [natural phenomena] and subject ]the experimenter].' All experiments then become two-fold, potentially revealing as much about natural phenomena as they reveal the experimenter to him or herself.

Goethe's methodology is mutual and intimate interaction of observer and observed; and, what transpires over time. Ideally as the experimenter's observed knowledge grows from his study of natural phenomena, so does his capacity for inner awareness, insight, Imagination, Intuition and Inspiration.

Where Cartesian-Newtonian science accepts only a single, practical syllogism about experimenters and research topics, Goethean Science demonstrates practicing science as an art, practice directed towards refining the experimenter's perceptions over time, heightening them towards Imagination, Inspiration and Intuition.

== Goethe's epistemology ==
Goethe saw the strongest opposition to his ideas in the mathematizing of physics. Goethe pleaded for "participatory recognition" as the way of natural sciences.

Goethe's method of science as art, of experiment as mediator between experimenter and Nature, can be applied to studies of every kind. Where Cartesian-Newtonian science defines and values the expansion of knowledge as a logical and linear march towards accumulating facts, Goethean Science defines and values the expansion of knowledge as: 1) Observing organic transformation in natural phenomena over time (historical progression); and 2) Organic transformation of the inner life of the experimenter.

Goethe developed two dynamic concepts – one of polarity (developed in his Chromatology) and one of logical-linear sequence (Morphology). These are applicable across all domains.

For Goethe understanding vital nature (natura naturans) is very much a function of taking impressions and activating thereby responses via the Gemüt (empathy, perhaps also compassion) so that one 'becomes what one perceives'. This is in line with Aristotle's empiricism.

The Kantian view is the realm of quantity and thing is separate from quality and phenomenon. Therefore, we can never be certain what we perceive is objectively real.

Goethe's new way of thinking (denken) is a parallel order of science [more a distinct, separate, more holistic paradigm], useful for getting past the heavy cognitive curtain erected by Kant, where only utilitarian ideas and science are valued.

As Amrine states, Goethe accepted the mathematical approach (mathesis) was appropriate for inert nature. However to become truly human, we cannot hold mathesis at the center of our life—apart from and dominating over—rational Feeling. Anything less than truly human values at the center of our life are inappropriate and counter-productive.

== Goethe and the idea of evolution ==
In the 1790s, Goethe rediscovered the premaxilla in humans, known as the incisive bone. He cited this as morphological evidence of humanity's connection to other mammalian species.

Goethe writes in Story of My Botanical Studies (1831):

The ever-changing display of plant forms, which I have followed for so many years, awakens increasingly within me the notion: The plant forms which surround us were not all created at some given point in time and then locked into the given form, they have been given… a felicitous mobility and plasticity allowing them to grow and adapt themselves to many different conditions in many different places.

Andrew Dickson White also writes with respect to evolutionary thought, in A History of the Warfare of Science with Theology in Christendom (1896):

About the end of the eighteenth century fruitful suggestions and even clear presentations of this or that part of a large evolutionary doctrine came thick and fast, and from the most divergent quarters. Especially remarkable were those from Erasmus Darwin in England, Maupertuis in France, Oken in Switzerland, and Herder, and, most brilliantly of all, from Goethe in Germany.

== Reception ==
Arthur Schopenhauer expanded on Goethe's research in optics using a different methodology in his On Vision and Colors.

Rudolf Steiner presents Goethe's approach to science as phenomenological in the Kürschner edition of Goethe's writings. Steiner elaborated on this in the books Goethean Science (1883) and Theory of Knowledge Implicit in Goethe's World-Conception (1886). in which he emphasizes the need of the perceiving organ of intuition in order to grasp Goethe's biological archetype (i.e. The Typus).

Steiner's branch of Goethean Science was extended by Oskar Schmiedel and Wilhelm Pelikan, who did research using Steiner's interpretations.

Ludwig Wittgenstein's discussions of Goethe's Theory of Colors were published as Bemerkungen über die Farben (Remarks on Color).

Goethe's vision of holistic science inspired biologist and paranormal researcher Rupert Sheldrake.

He went to an Anglican boarding school and then took biology at Cambridge, studying "life" by killing animals and then grinding them up to extract their DNA. This was troubling. Rescue came when a friend turned him on to Goethe. This old German's 18th century vision of "holistic science" appealed to the young Brit very much. Sheldrake used Goethe to investigate how the lilies of the field actually become lilies of the field.

Sheldrake is famous for the term "morphogenetic field" actually a quote from one of Steiner's students, Poppelbaum.

American philosopher Walter Kaufmann argued that Freud's psychoanalysis was a "poetic science" in Goethe's sense.

In 1998, David Seamon and Arthur Zajonc wrote Goethe's way of science: a phenomenology of nature.

Also in 1998, Henri Bortoft wrote The Wholeness of Nature: Goethe's Science of Conscious Participation in Nature in which he discusses the relevance and importance of Goethe's approach to modern scientific thought.

Biologist Brian Goodwin (1931-2009) in his book How the Leopard Changed Its Spots : The Evolution of Complexity claimed that organisms as dynamic systems are the primary agents of creative evolutionary adaptation, in the book Goodwin stated: "The ideas I am developing in this book are very much in the Goethean spirit."

== See also ==
- Goetheanism
- Oswald Spengler
- Romanticism in science
