= LogoVisual thinking =

For human communication, LogoVisual thinking (also LogoVisual technology and LVT) is a practical methodology and tool that helps people think.

It is used by management teams, project leaders, teachers and students as a means of tapping the diversity of groups and enabling many people to participate in effective thinking processes.

It makes thinking visible and tactile by making ideas into moveable objects displayed on writeable surfaces – for instance magnetic dry-wipe shapes on whiteboards. Structured processes guide people's thinking to achieve their intended outcomes.

It can be used to help facilitate group discussions, and for helping people to find solutions for problems.

Sometimes people have called such meetings "brain storming sessions".

== Development ==
LVT is both an overall concept and a methodology. It developed out of structural communication, systematics (the study of multi-term systems), and other work of J. G. Bennett in the 1960s, recent development being sponsored by Centre for Management Creativity. It emerged out of Gurdjieff's works such as the Movements and Enneagram. LVT evolved independently but in parallel with Tony Buzan's mindmapping, Edward de Bono's lateral thinking, Japanese affinity diagrams, Robert Horn's visual language, Gabriele Rico's 'clustering' and many other emergent trends from the 1960s onwards.

== Description ==
As a general concept it covers the region of learning and communication in which three modes of intelligence are combined for understanding: verbal, visual and haptic. It is thus related to multiple intelligences. The structure of the process supports metacognition. It makes the making of meaning the main focus of its technology. The technology extends verbal expression to visual arrangement and brings into play physical manipulation of 'meaning objects'. The haptic component of physical contact and action is a primary distinguishing feature of LVT.

LVT's three components are logo, visual, and thinking. The first entails the articulation of discrete units of meaning in words and icons while the second involves the identification and manipulation of patterns and connections. The third component is about the achievement of new levels of understanding or perception. There are five standard stages in the process and these are:

1. Focus – identifying a question or theme that provides a basis for a common act of attention
2. Gather – generating, articulating and displaying separate MMs as a relevant set as in a gathering
3. Organise – arranging and aggregating MMs to form (separate) higher order MMs
4. Integrate – systematic or aesthetic unification of these MMs into a whole system
5. Realise – creative or 'willed' outcome.

The concept emphasises the logos or meaning of words in statements that are 'molecules of meaning', which can be understood autonomously and in combinations. Each molecule of meaning (MM) exists on a separate object. MMs can be placed on a visual display and moved around in relation to each other. Meaningful aggregates of MMs are replaced by higher order MMs. Use of MMs distinguishes LVT from other current techniques of display such as mindmapping because (a) MMs are statements and not single words (b) they are free to be moved about and are not fixed in position (c) they can form into any kind of pattern and not just hierarchical ones. In principle, every MM can be seen in the context of any of the other MMs in a given set.

The technological freedom of MMs enables people to suspend collapse into set forms and/or conclusions (convergent thinking), while providing structure to their explorations (divergent thinking). A complex process of thinking by a group can easily be tracked and recorded.

LVT supports process of democracy because it enables people to think together. It articulates thinking in a public shared space, in which structure is given equal attention to content. It relates strongly to dialogue and can be called a 'technology of dialogue'.

LVT emphasises the importance of articulate statement. Each MM is symbolic of an individual in a social setting, capable of finding many complex relations with other individuals; rather than a 'thing' that has to be fixed into a mechanical order.

In the stage of Gathering, the assembly of MMs is deliberately chaotic. This allows for complexity in aggregations.

In stage three, Organising can be of different kinds but in particular explore the tensions between using prefigured forms – classifications, hierarchies, etc. – and allowing the MMs to self-organise. The flexibility and range of Organise in LVT distinguishes it from the use of set forms as in mindmapping. The capacity to insert, remove and rearrange MMs in organising is a totally new dimension of thinking technology.

The fourth stage of Integrating draws on structural insights into complex texts, in particular the principles of ring composition as discovered by the English anthropologist Mary Douglas.

The stages move from contemplation to decision making.
