= Verlag Freies Geistesleben & Urachhaus =

The Verlag Freies Geistesleben & Urachhaus GmbH is a publishing company based in Stuttgart, publishing under the imprints of Verlag Freies Geistesleben and Verlag Urachhaus. The company has its roots in the Anthroposophical movement, and is publishing a wide range of titles, including many classic titles.

The Verlag Freies Geistesleben (meaning free intellectual/spiritual life) was founded in 1947 on the initiative of the Free Waldorf School of Stuttgart and the Anthroposophical Society of Stuttgart, and has an emphasis on literature on or aimed at education, particularly waldorf education, as well as anthroposophy in general, social sciences, culture and history, art and architecture, music, natural sciences, and children's literature.

The Verlag Urachhaus was founded in 1925 by Gertrud Spörri, Emil Bock and Ernst Scheiffele under the name Verlag der Christengemeinschaft, and originally published mostly Christian literature, being affiliated with The Christian Community, although it since broadened its publishing profile. Due to Nazi persecution, the company changed its name to Verlag Urachhaus, after the street where its offices in Stuttgart were located, in 1936. However, the Gestapo stormed the office of the company on June 9, 1941, and seized all its holdings, the company was subsequently liquidated in 1942. Following the war, it was reestablished in 1946. After the Christian Community inherited the personal archive of Christian Morgenstern, the Verlag Urachhaus published a complete edition of the work of Morgenstern in nine volumes, known as the "Stuttgart edition".

The two companies merged under the name Verlag Freies Geistesleben & Urachhaus in the mid 1990s, but continue to operate as separate imprints.
