= The Oxford Times =

British newspaper

- Type: Weekly newspaper
- Format: Compact
- Owner: Newsquest
- Editor: Andrew Colley
- Founded: 1862
- Language: English
- Headquarters: 1 King's Meadow, Ferry Hinksey Road, Osney Mead, Oxford
- Circulation: 3,023 (print) (as of 2025)

The Oxford Times is a weekly newspaper, published each Thursday in Oxford, England. The paper is owned by Newsquest, the UK subsidiary of US-based Gannett Company.

The Oxford Times has a number of colour supplements. Oxfordshire Limited Edition is included with the first edition of each month. There is also a monthly In Business supplement.

The Oxford Times has several sister publications:

- The Herald Series – a set of weekly newspapers covering Abingdon, Wantage, Wallingford and Didcot.
- Witney Gazette – a weekly newspaper covering Witney and Carterton.
- Bicester Advertiser – a weekly newspaper covering Bicester.
- Oxford Mail – a daily newspaper published Monday to Saturday founded in 1928.

== History ==
The Oxford Times was founded in 1862 as a weekly broadsheet.

In 1922, T. E. Lawrence (known as Lawrence of Arabia) commissioned The Oxford Times to typeset and print an advance private edition of Seven Pillars of Wisdom. This is known as the "1922 Edition" or the "Oxford Text" of Seven Pillars.

The Oxford Times has won a number of national awards, including Regional Weekly Newspaper of the Year in 2004, 2005, and 2007.

Originally a broadsheet, it switched to the compact format in 2008. Until 24 October 2008, the paper was published each Friday. Since then, it has appeared each Thursday.

Over time, through the emergence of digitisation and online news, print circulation gradually declined (from 26,262 in 2006 to 3,023 in 2025) while online circulation increased. The Oxford Times has been incorporated into the website of its sister publication, The Oxford Mail.
