= Henri Bortoft =

Peter Henri Bortoft
- Born: 1938
- Died: 29 December 2012 (age 74); Matlaske, Norfolk, England
- Other name: Henri Bortoft
- Occupations: Researcher, teacher, lecturer and writer
- Known for: Study of Goethe, and the development of modern science
- Notable work: The Wholeness of Nature

Peter Henri Bortoft (1938 – 29 December 2012) was a British independent researcher and teacher, lecturer and writer on physics and the philosophy of science. He is best known for his work The Wholeness of Nature, considered a relevant and original recent interpretation of Goethean science. His book Taking Appearance Seriously: The Dynamic Way of Seeing in Goethe and European Thought was published in 2012.

== Education ==
Bortoft completed his studies at the University of Hull, and then performed postgraduate research on the foundations of quantum physics at Birkbeck College, where theoretical physicist David Bohm introduced him to the problem of wholeness in quantum theory. Subsequently, Bortoft worked with John G. Bennett on Bennett's Systematics (also known as Multi-Term Systems), which was Bennett's methodology for assisting the systematic and progressive understanding of systems, complexity, and wholeness, and on efforts with Bennett and with Kenneth W. Pledge to develop a formal language that was rigorously descriptive of scientific activity. Those efforts were published in Systematics: The Journal of the Institute for the Comparative Study of History, Philosophy and the Sciences, listed below.

== Career ==
Bortoft taught physics and philosophy of science at Schumacher College in the framework of the program in Holistic Science. He held numerous lectures and seminars in Great Britain and the United States on the scientific work of Johann Wolfgang von Goethe and on the development of modern science.

== Death ==
Bortoft died on 29 December 2012 at his home in Matlaske, Norfolk, aged 74.

== Works ==
- Henri Bortoft Taking Appearance Seriously: The Dynamic Way of Seeing in Goethe and European Thought, Floris Books, 2012, ISBN 978-086315-927-5.
- The Wholeness of Nature: Goethe's way toward a science of conscious participation in nature, Lindisfarne Press, 1996, ISBN 978-0-940262-79-9.
- Henri Bortoft: Goethes naturwissenschaftliche Methode (Goethe's scientific method). Stuttgart 1995, ISBN 3-7725-1544-4.
- Goethe's Scientific Consciousness, Octagon press, 1986, ISBN 978-0-904674-10-1. Note that Goethe's Scientific Consciousness is reused as part II of the book The Wholeness of Nature
- "Counterfeit and Authentic Wholes", In D. Seamon and R. Mugerauer, eds.: Dwelling, Place and Environment: Toward a Phenomenology of Person and World, pp. 281–302, Columbia University Press, 1985.
- The Whole: Counterfeit and Authentic, Systematics, 9 (2) (September, 1971), pp. 43–73.
- Review Discussion: A Systematic Critique of the Management of Science, Systematics, 7 (4) (March, 1971), pp. 347–351.
- The Ambiguity of ‘One’ and ‘Two’ in Young’s Experiment, Systematics, 8 (3) (December, 1970), available online at http://www.toutley.demon.co.uk/HB.htm.
- Language, Will, and the Fact, Systematics, 6 (3) (December, 1968).
- “The Resolution by a Rigorous Descriptive Method of Some Dilemmas in Physical Science – Part 1”, Systematics, 4 (2) (September, 1966). This article reflects Bortoft’s development of the idea of a rigorous descriptive method in the earlier article below and restates the Descriptive Model more concisely and elegantly, with an emphasis on the collective, sociological will of the scientific community.
- with J. G. Bennett and K. W. Pledge: Towards an Objectively Complete Language: An essay in objective description as applied to scientific procedure, Systematics, 3 (3) (December, 1965).
