= Shivapuri Baba =

Hindu saint from South East Asia

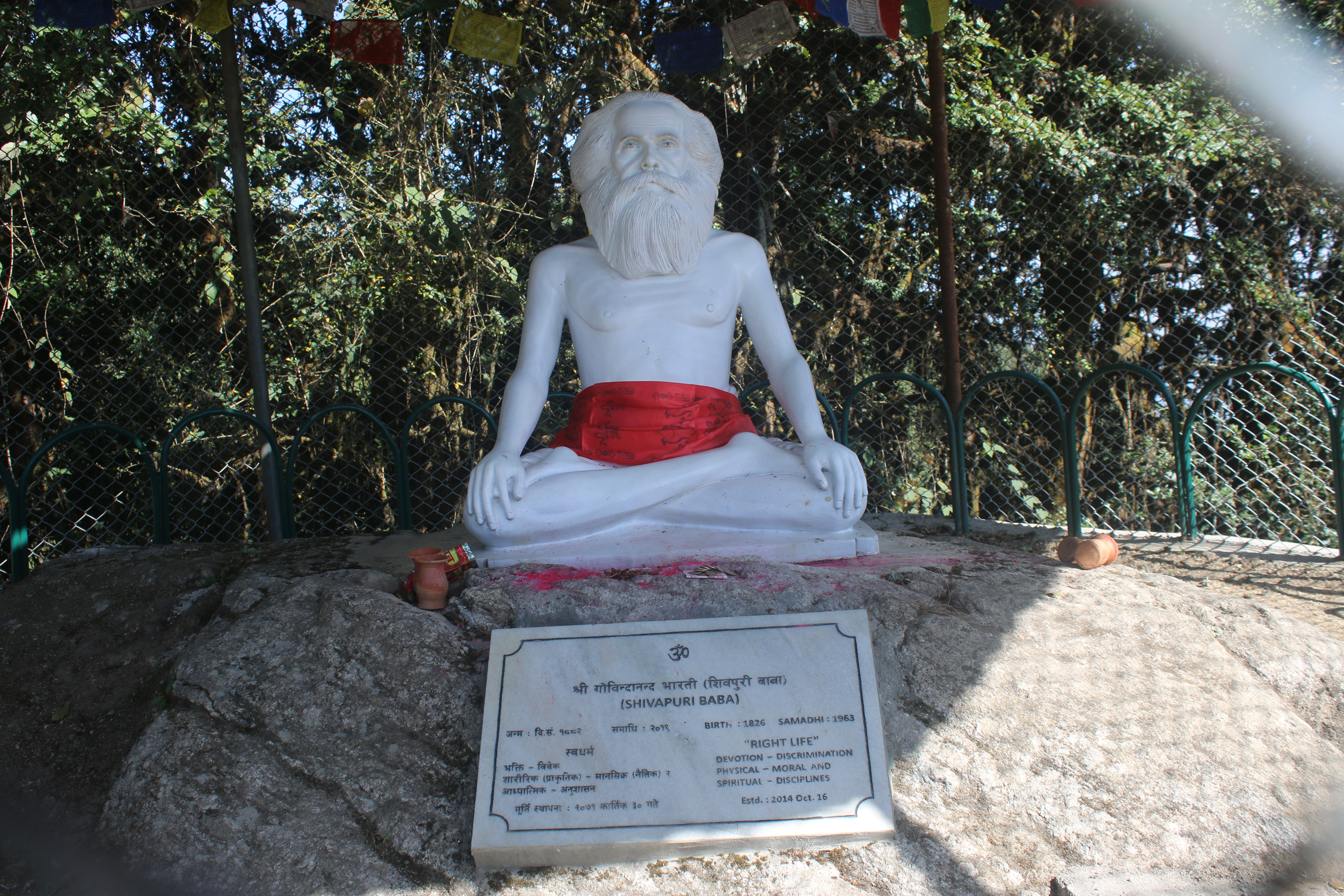
Statue of shivapuri baba

Shivapuri Baba (Nepali: शिवपुरी बाबा) was a Hindu saint. His birth name was Jayanthan Nambudiripad and is also known by the name of Swami Govindananda Bharati. He died on 28 January 1963 (2019, Magh 15, Sombar, Tritiya Tithi) at Dhrubsthali, near Pashupatinath Temple in Nepal. He claimed to have been born in 1826 in Kerala, a region in southern India. Shivapuri baba came to Nepal and spent the later stage of his life by meditating in the forest of Shivpuri in Kathmandu, Nepal, from where his name was derived.
