= Structural communication =

Concept developed by John G. Bennett

Structural communication was developed in the 1960s by John G. Bennett and his research team to simulate the structure and quality of a small group tutorial through automated means. It provides access to high level learning for many students without much supervision. A communication consists of both information and structure. An effective two-way communication involves mutual verification of understanding through comparisons of structure. In structural communication, information is provided that participants have to organize in explicit ways.

Structural Communication is an instructional approach that provides a simulated dialogue between an author of instructional materials and the students. It has been called "an interactive technique for communicating understanding". Understanding is "inferred if a student shows the ability to use knowledge appropriately in different contexts, and to organize knowledge elements in accordance with specified organizing principles" (Egan, 1972, p. 66). The technique was designed to encourage creative thinking in learners, allowing them to develop an understanding of a topic, not simply to memorize facts. Furthermore, Structural Communication was designed to promote learning for social action. "Hodgson, in line with many current constructivists, viewed the social contexts of the learning activity to be critical for the transfer of learning to practical situations". The distinctions between the learning of knowledge and the learning for social action are evident in the components Bennett and Hodgson designed into the Structural Communication technique. The seven components of a Structural Communication unit are described below.

== Components ==
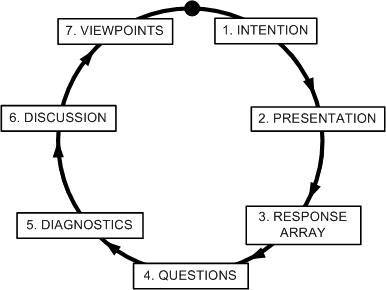

=== 1. Intention ===
The opening statement, which defines what is to be studied, provides an overview, possibly an "advance organizer", and sometimes a rationale. It is used to provide a context for the content of the study unit and a focus for the study.

=== 2. Presentation ===
The material, experience, exercise, case study, etc. which supplies the essential facts and concepts of the domain being studied. This may be an existing text, a video, a case study, a simulation, or real-life experience, depending on the overall strategy of the exercise. This could also be any sort of computer-based instruction, including simulations.

=== 3. Response Array ===
A randomized array of items which summarize key parts, concepts or principles from the knowledge base that is being used and studied in the exercise. It often resembles a "key point summary" of the Presentation.

=== 4. Questions ===
A set of problems for solution, which are designed to present the "intellectual challenge" that is an essential part of the Structural Communication methodology. These problems are interrelated and are open-ended to allow multiple responses and viewpoints. The purpose of the investigation section is for the learner to interact with the subject. To respond to a question, a student selects a number of items from the Response Array that, taken together, summarize what must be brought to bear on it.

Challenge: Problem 4

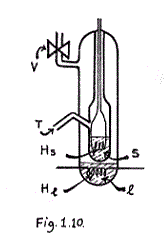

Here is a diagram of an apparatus for measuring the latent heat of vaporization of a liquid S at various temperatures. The tube T leads to a vessel that is kept slightly cooler than the main enclosure. H_{l} and H_{S} are two heating coils. l is the same liquid which is used to control the temperature inside the main enclosure. Taken together, the valve V (which opens to a pump), the heating coil H_{l}, and the liquid l, form a control system. Select those items on the Array which indicate what is prevented from happening by this control system. Then also indicate how this is done.

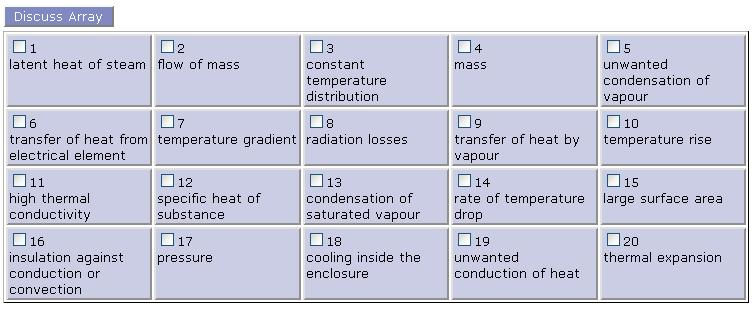

=== 5. Diagnostics ===
These are sets of logical tests of inclusion and exclusion. Relative to any given question, the author ascribes values of "essential", "relevant", "irrelevant" and "misleading" to the items of the Response Array and builds his tests around them. The student is not shown what these tests are but is given a set of comments based on his response.

=== 6. Comments ===
The Comments are constructive statements that discuss in depth the rationale for including or excluding certain items. They can accommodate alternative interpretations and also serve to further the discourse represented in the Presentation.

=== 7. Viewpoints ===
An outline of the author's, and other alternative viewpoints; this may review some aspects stated in the Intention, make explicit some biases or standpoints held dear by the author, draw attention to other views in the literature, etc. Ideally, the viewpoint section plays a final, interactive role between author and learner.

An additional aspect of the Structural Communication study unit is the assessment of the learner's responses to the questions posed by the study unit.

== Sample Exercises ==
John G. Bennett's Teaching System This gives an introduction to and description of the method and two educational applications, in physics and history, which can be tried out online.

Exercise made using Authorware

== History and development ==
The basic method was developed in the 1960s for educational use. Work was done with the electronics company GEC to develop a teaching machine – the ‘Systemaster’ – because at this time there was little widespread use of computers.

By the 1970s, structural communication had also come to be applied to management training. Anthony Hodgson made significant changes to the method. Firstly, the items that had previously been provided by an ‘expert’ were replaced by ones generated by the group itself. Secondly, in place of a static array, each item was put onto a separate magnetic hexagon that could be attached to and moved on a suitable whiteboard. This meant that people could generate and physically handle the items. In place of making selections in an abstract way, they could physically ‘cluster’ them together to make various meanings.

In the 1980s, software was developed. And the method was linked to decision theory.

In the 1990s, the method was re-interpreted as LogoVisual thinking and cast in the form of a fivefold process, now seen as universally applicable to any thinking process.

By the twenty-first century, it was again finding many applications in schools as well as management and communities. It proved especially versatile in dealing with a wide range of numbers of people, from a single individual to many hundreds.
