= Muhammad Subuh Sumohadiwidjojo =

Indonesian religious leader (1901–1987)

- Muhammad Subuh in the 1980s
- Born: Muhammad Subuh Sumohadiwidjojo; June 22, 1901; Kedungjati, Dutch East Indies
- Died: June 23, 1987 (aged 86)
- Other names: Pak Subuh, Bapak
- Occupation: Spiritual leader
- Years active: 1930s–1987
- Known for: Subud

Muhammad Subuh Sumohadiwidjojo (22 June 1901 – 23 June 1987) was an Indonesian who founded the movement known as Subud. Muhammad Subuh said he received as a young man a series of intense experiences that he believed gave him contact with a spiritual energy from a higher power. By the 1930s, he believed that it was his task to transmit this energy—which he called latihan kejiwaan (Indonesian for "spiritual exercise")—to others, but that he was not to seek people out but simply to wait for those who asked for it.

In 1956, Pak Subuh, or "Bapak" as he was called by members of Subud (the word "Bapak" is Indonesian for something akin to father), was invited to England by J. G. Bennett, where many Westerners joined Subud. He was then asked to go to other countries such as the United States and Australia. In this way, Subud spread rapidly around the world.

When he died in 1987 he left many talks on tape, video and in print, which Subud uses to guide the organization he founded.

== Biography ==
Muhammad Subuh Sumohadiwidjojo was born in June 22, 1901 in Kedungjati, a village near Semarang in Central Java in what is then the Dutch East Indies.

At the age of six or seven Subuh went to a private Dutch school. When Subuh was fifteen or sixteen years old an old man, dressed in black and carrying a staff, awakened him. Later Subuh understood that this man must have been Sunan Kalijaga, an ancestor saint who returned to this world in order to look after Subuh (Sumohadiwidjojo 1991: 23–24). The man uttered this prophecy: “Remember. When you are thirty-two years old, you will be called by Almighty God.” For Subuh this could only mean that he was going to die at the age of thirty-two.

After his vision, Subuh became the breadwinner for his family working as a bookkeeper at the Semarang City Hall while feeling an intense spiritual quest to understand his vision. The most important spiritual teacher of Subuh during these years was Shaykh Abdurachman who was a well-known shaykh of the Naqshbandī order of dervishes. Like most other spiritual teachers he immediately noticed ‘the spiritual potential’ of the young Muhammad Subuh.

Muhammad Subuh wrote in his autobiography that, about the year 1932, he had a visionary visit to the highest heaven, the "Seventh Heaven". By his account, one night he felt drowsy and went to lie down in bed. Instead of falling asleep, he felt himself "lengthen, widen and expand into a sphere" and then entered a great space. He saw a group of stars far away and was told that it was the universe he had left behind. He then traveled at great speed through a great expanse and beyond, there were seven (7) "mountain-like cones of light, one stacked upon another". He described how he entered the cones of light one after another until he entered the seventh, the last. Then he returned to earth and saw what looked like stars in the sky but later realized they were the lights of Semarang, the hometown where he lived. He even tarried a little over the rooftop of his own house trying to lift up some roof tiles with his fingers but instead found himself inside his own room. It was about the time of Subuh or dawn.

In his description Muhammad Subuh implied the seventh cone of light represents the highest heaven.

From his first visit to Britain in 1957 until his death 30 years later in 1987, Muhammad Subuh is estimated to have travelled 594,320 miles outside Indonesia, visiting Subud groups around the world. On these trips he gave explanations about the nature of the Latihan spiritual exercise and the purpose and meaning of the spiritual association of Subud. Approximately 1,400 of these talks were recorded, with provisional translations to English made available at the time. These talks are currently being re-translated and republished by Subud Publications International. There are now Subud groups in over 70 countries, with a worldwide membership of about 10,000.

In the late 1950s, British academic John G. Bennett came under Pak Subuh's influence and funded his career, believing Pak Subuh to be a messiah. By 1960, once interest in Subud had faded, Bennett had left Subud and became a Catholic. The actress Eva Bartok was also a supporter of Pak Subuh.

== Works ==
- Sumohadiwidjojo, Muhammad-Subuh (1990). Autobiography: The History of Bapak R.M.Muhammad Subuh Sumohadiwidjojo, Founder of the Spiritual Association of Susila Budhi Dharma, or Subud. Subud Publications International. ISBN 1-869822-07-2.
- Sumohadiwidjojo, Muhammad-Subuh (1993). Bapak's Talks, Volume 1. Subud Publications International.
