= Metamorphosis of Plants =

1790 work by Johann Wolfgang von Goethe

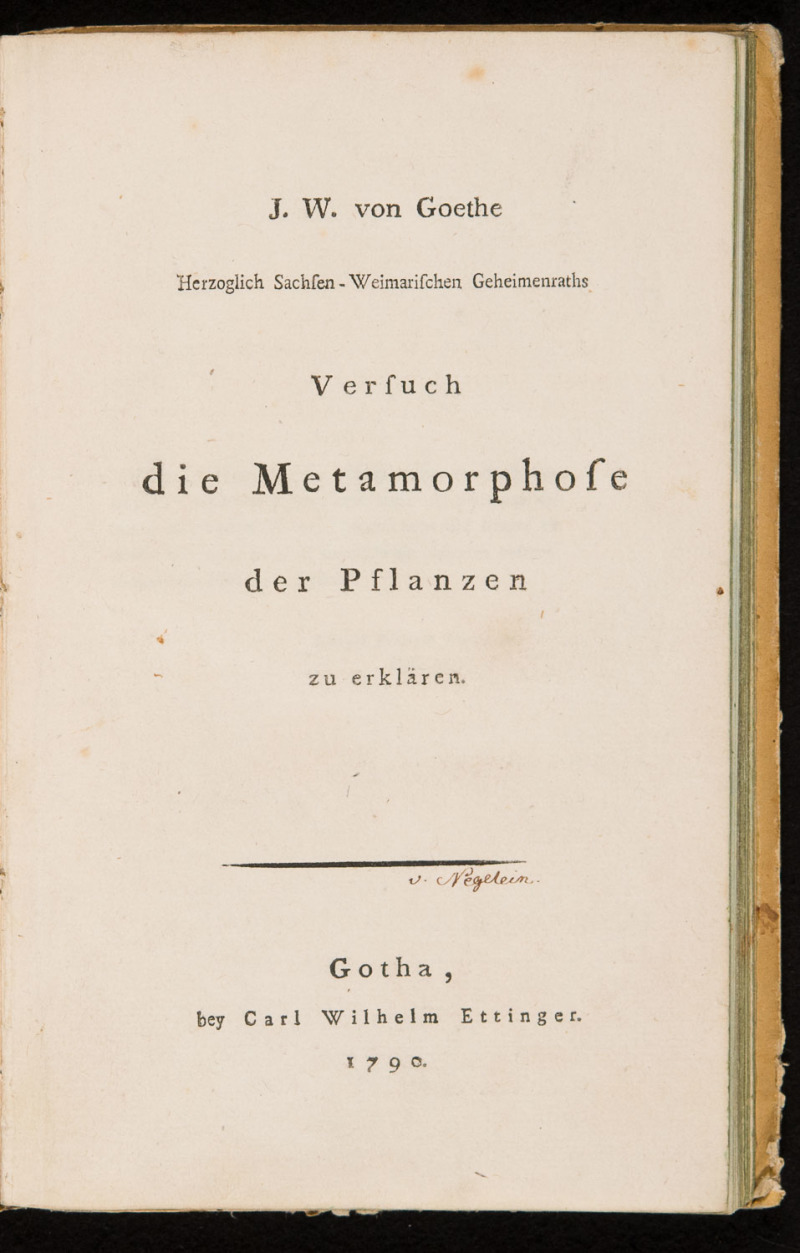
Edition from 1790

Versuch die Metamorphose der Pflanzen zu erklären, known in English as Metamorphosis of Plants, was published by German poet and philosopher Johann Wolfgang von Goethe in 1790. In this work, Goethe essentially discovered the (serially) homologous nature of leaf organs in plants, from cotyledons, to photosynthetic leaves, to the petals of a flower. Although Sir Richard Owen, the British vertebrate anatomist, is generally credited with first articulating a definition of the word "homology" (in 1843), it is clear that Goethe had already arrived at a sophisticated view of homology and transformation (within an idealist morphological perspective) more than fifty years earlier.

== See also ==
- Goethean science
- Phyllody
- Teratology
