= Subud =

Spiritual movement

Subud (pronounced [ˈsʊbʊd]) is an international and interfaith spiritual movement that originated in Indonesia in the 1920s. It was founded by Muhammad Subuh Sumohadiwidjojo (1901–1987). (Note: The name "Subud" was first used in the 1940s, when the movement was legally registered in Indonesia.) The central practice of Subud is a spiritual exercise known as the latihan kejiwaan, which Muhammad Subuh described as receiving guidance from "the Power of God" or "the Great Life Force."

Subuh stated that Subud was neither a new teaching nor a religion. He suggested that, through the latihan, members could be guided toward a religion suited to them, such as Christianity, Judaism, Islam, Hinduism, or Buddhism. While many Subud members believe that adherence to a religion may provide discipline that supports inner development, such adherence is not considered a requirement for participation in Subud or the latihan.

As of 2023, Subud has groups in about 83 countries and an estimated worldwide membership of 10,000.

== Etymology ==
The name "Subud" is an acronym derived from three Javanese words: Susila Budhi Dharma. These, in turn, originate from Sanskrit terms: suśīla (good-tempered), buddhi, and dharma.

The original Sanskrit terms are generally defined as follows:

- Suśīla: "well-disposed", "having an amiable disposition", "good-tempered".
- Buddhi: "intelligence, mind, reason".
- Dharma: the law that "upholds, supports or maintains the regulatory order of the universe".

Pak Subuh provided different interpretations of these terms:

- Susila: the good character of humanity in accordance with the will of Almighty God.
- Budhi: the force of the inner self within a person.
- Dharma: surrender, trust, and sincerity towards Almighty God.

== History ==
Bapak Muhammad Subuh Sumohadiwidjojo

According to accounts given by Muhammad Subuh Sumohadiwidjojo in talks to Subud members, in 1925 he had an unexpected experience while taking a late-night walk. He described being enveloped in a brilliant light and seeing what appeared to be the sun descending onto his body. Believing he was experiencing a heart attack, he went home, lay down, and prepared to die, surrendering himself to God.

Instead of dying, he reported that he was moved from within to stand up and perform movements resembling his Muslim prayer routine. He stated that these movements were not initiated by his own will but were guided by what he interpreted as the power of God. Similar experiences reportedly continued for several hours each night over a period of about 1,000 days. During this time he said he slept little but was still able to work full-time, while also receiving what he described as an "inner teaching" through which he spontaneously gained understanding of various matters.

Subuh further stated that as these experiences continued, he developed an intuitive insight into people and situations. Around 1933, he reported that when others were physically near him during the latihan, they began to experience it as well. By his early thirties, his reputation for spiritual insight had spread, and people began coming to him to be "opened". Those who were opened could in turn open others, a process that led to the spread of Subud.

Husein Rofé in 1955 in Hong Kong

In Jakarta, Subuh met Husein Rofé, an English linguist who had been living in Indonesia since 1950. Rofé, who had been searching for a spiritual path, became the first non-Indonesian to be opened.

Subud began to expand outside Indonesia when Rofé attended a religious congress in Japan in 1954. From there, it spread to Japan, Hong Kong, and Cyprus. In 1957, while based in London, Rofé suggested that Subuh visit Britain. Subuh accepted and stayed at the home of John G. Bennett in Coombe Springs. During this period, many followers of George Gurdjieff in the United Kingdom joined Subud, including Bennett himself, although he later left the movement. Over the next 14 months Subuh visited several countries before returning to Indonesia.

== Symbol ==
"Seven Circles" symbol of Subud

The Subud symbol was introduced by Pak Subuh in 1959. It consists of seven concentric circles and seven spokes, which in traditional Javanese mysticism are said to represent seven life forces as well as the Great Life Force that unites them. Each circle becomes wider as it moves outward from the centre, and each spoke narrows as it approaches the centre. The spacing between the circles remains constant.

The symbol is commonly printed in black and white when colour printing is not available. When colours are used, the circles and spokes are typically gold, with a dark blue or black background. Other variations include blue on white or white on blue. The World Subud Association has registered both the design and the name "Subud" as trade, service, or collective membership marks in multiple countries.

== Practices ==
The core practice of Subud is the latihan kejiwaan (literally "spiritual exercise" or "training of the spirit"), commonly referred to as the latihan. According to Pak Subuh, Subud is:

This is the symbol of a person who has a calm and peaceful inner feeling and who is able to receive the contact with the Great Holy Life Force. As the spiritual training (latihan kedjiwaan) of Subud is free from the influence of the passions, desires and thinking, and is truly awakened by the Power of Almighty God, the aim of Subud is naturally toward perfection of character according to the Will of the One Who awakens it, namely: Almighty God. It is also necessary to explain that Subud is neither a kind of religion nor a teaching, but is a spiritual experience awakened by the Power of God leading to spiritual reality free from the influence of the passions, desires and thinking.

The latihan is not a technique that is learned or practiced in a conventional sense. It is considered unique to each person, and the ability to "receive" it is transmitted by being in the presence of another practising member during an "opening". About twice a week, members usually gather at local centres to participate in a group latihan, conducted separately for men and women. The practice typically begins after a quiet period, when a "helper" signals the start of the exercise.

Participants are advised to follow whatever arises spontaneously from within, without expectation, concentration on images, recitation of mantras, or the use of meditation or substances. They are encouraged simply to intend to surrender to God, the divine, or the transcendent—according to their own understanding. Each member is expected to focus only on their own experience, without reference to others in the room. During latihan, practitioners may move, make sounds, walk, dance, laugh, cry, or express themselves in other involuntary ways, while remaining fully conscious and free to stop at any time.

Members often describe the latihan as providing what they need in their lives at the time. For some, initial experiences are described as a kind of purification, followed by deeper engagement. Others report feelings of being cleansed, centred, peaceful, or energised. The latihan is sometimes said to continue to influence practitioners throughout daily life, not only during formal practice. Subud literature describes it as a way of deepening one's natural connection with wisdom, the higher self, the divine, or God, depending on personal interpretation.

Although the latihan can be undertaken alone, members are generally encouraged to attend group latihan regularly, ideally twice a week. Once experienced enough to recognise when to end their own session, a member may also practise at home.

While the suggestions of Subud's founder are valued by many members, Subud does not require belief in any doctrine, and the latihan is open to people of all faiths or none. Officially, Subud does not promote a particular teaching about the nature or benefits of the latihan.

=== The Opening ===
The "opening" refers to a person's first experience of the latihan, which is considered the moment when the "contact" is first received. It is often described metaphorically as a candle flame lighting another candle, where the flame remains unchanged in quality.

In most cases, a person becomes able to participate in the latihan only after undergoing this formal opening process. During the opening, the individual is accompanied by one or more experienced members, known as "helpers". The person is asked to stand and relax while the helpers stand nearby. A short statement, sometimes referred to as the "opening words", is read by one of the helpers to acknowledge the individual’s wish to receive the contact. The helpers then begin the exercise as usual, and the new participant is regarded as receiving the contact of the latihan kejiwaan without conscious effort by anyone present.

=== Testing ===
Testing is a variation of the latihan that is directed toward receiving guidance or insight on a particular issue. A question or request for clarification is first acknowledged, and then the exercise is undertaken with openness to that issue. The original term used by Muhammad Subuh was terimah, an Indonesian word meaning "receiving". Practitioners who have been engaged in the latihan for some time often report recognising impressions or intuitions from their "inner feeling" in response to questions posed.

These impressions may take different forms, such as sounds, visions, vibrations, or spontaneous physical movements similar to those experienced in the regular latihan, though sometimes more intense. Such responses are generally described as difficult to interpret through intellectual analysis, and participants acknowledge that guidance can be influenced or obscured by their own mental or emotional attitudes. Testing is usually regarded as a means of clarifying present issues rather than as a form of fortune-telling, although members differ in their views on its reliability. Many Subud members consider testing helpful in addressing personal or organisational matters.

Testing is commonly used within the World Subud Association in the selection of helpers and, at times, committee members. In his book Susila Budhi Dharma, written in 1952, Subuh referred to such practices as "feeling" or "receiving". The term "testing" was first applied in 1957 by John G. Bennett.

=== Fasting ===
Some Subud members voluntarily undertake fasting, a practice recommended by Pak Subuh. Each year, some members fast during the Muslim observance of Ramadan, which Subuh, himself a Muslim, suggested could also be appropriate for non-Muslims. Others choose to fast during Lent, or follow a personal or regular fasting practice. Within Subud, fasting is generally regarded by practitioners as spiritually beneficial, although it is not a requirement.

=== Rules ===
Pak Subuh gave advice and guidance in his talks to support members as their practice of the latihan developed. In general, there are no formal rules governing the latihan. However, non-members may not participate in the exercise until they have undergone the process of "opening" and received the contact.

Subuh intended the latihan to be accessible to people of all cultures, faiths, and ethnicities. Respect for individual diversity and the uniqueness of each practitioner, combined with the relative absence of prescriptive rules, have been noted as features that appeal to many members.

== Association ==
Members who wish to take on organizational responsibilities within Subud may volunteer as committee members or as helpers. These roles can be performed at local, regional, national, and international levels, and members often move between responsibilities as needed.

The highest level of organizational responsibility rests with the World Subud Association. The association organizes a World Congress every four years, which includes the Subud World Council, representatives from each national Subud organization, and individual members who choose to participate, although only the representatives have voting rights. The headquarters of the international organization rotates to a different country every four years.

=== Helpers ===
At each level of the association, members known as "helpers" assist with coordinating group latihan, witnessing the opening of new members, providing information to those interested in the latihan, addressing questions or issues related to the latihan, and, when needed, supporting isolated or indisposed members. Helpers are typically selected from members willing to perform these duties, usually through a process called testing. Selection does not imply that a helper is more spiritually advanced than other members.

Helpers exist at local, regional (in some countries), national, and international levels. Their designation primarily reflects the scope of supportive duties they are expected to provide, rather than geographic restrictions. For example, a local helper from London traveling to Jakarta may perform testing or participate in a new member's opening in the same manner as an Indonesian helper.

There are normally 18 international helpers—nine men and nine women. Three men and three women are assigned to each of three global areas within Subud:

- Area I: Zones 1 & 2 (Australasia and Asia)
- Area II: Zones 3, 4, 5 & 6 (Europe and Africa)
- Area III: Zones 7, 8 & 9 (the Americas)

International helpers serve as members of the World Subud Council on a voluntary basis for a four-year term, coinciding with the interval between World Congresses. There is no formal distinction in rank between local, national, or international helpers, nor between helpers, committee members, or ordinary members. Being a helper is considered a service role rather than a mark of special ability or spiritual achievement.

=== Ibu Rahayu ===
Ibu Siti Rahayu Wiryohudoyo is the eldest daughter of Pak Subuh. In a talk delivered on 5 March 2010 at a National Gathering in Semarang, Indonesia, she explained how she was appointed as "spiritual advisor" by the Subud International Congress.

=== Committees ===
Most Subud groups have a committee, typically including a chairperson, vice-chair, treasurer, and secretary. This committee is responsible for arranging a place for group latihan, managing communications, overseeing budgets, and supporting the collective efforts of members at the local level. Similar committee structures exist at regional (in some countries), national, zonal, and international levels.

At the international level, the executive body is the International Subud Committee (ISC). The ISC oversees communications, publishing, budgeting, archives, and support for affiliates, and it organizes the World Congress every four years. The ISC chairperson also sits on the World Subud Council.

For practical organizational purposes, the Subud association is divided into nine multinational zones:

- Zones 1 & 2 – Australasia and Asia
- Zone 3 – eight countries in Western Europe
- Zone 4 – Central and Eastern Europe
- Zones 5 & 6 – Francophone and Anglophone African countries, respectively
- Zone 7 – USA, Canada, Mexico, Cuba, Jamaica, Suriname, and the Caribbean
- Zone 8 – northern part of South America
- Zone 9 – southern part of South America

Each zone has four representatives who serve as voting members of the World Subud Council. They are selected at Zone Meetings and serve a voluntary four-year term, similar to international helpers.

The chairperson of the World Subud Association serves a four-year term from one World Congress to the next and also chairs the World Subud Council. The council is responsible for ensuring that decisions made at the World Congress are implemented.

=== Affiliates ===
Subud affiliates, sometimes referred to as "wings," are subsidiary organizations that focus on specific projects at the national or international level. They are legally independent but often have overlapping boards of trustees. These affiliates include:

- Susila Dharma International Association (SDI or SDIA) – humanitarian projects
- Subud International Cultural Association (SICA) – cultural networking activities
- Subud Enterprise Services International (SES or SESI) – networking for entrepreneurial initiatives
- Subud Youth Association (SYA) – networking among younger Subud members
- Subud International Health Organisation (SIHA) – integrates both scientific and alternative approaches to health

Some chairpersons of these affiliates also serve on the World Subud Council for a four-year term.

In addition, the Muhammad Subuh Foundation (MSF) has been established to assist Subud groups in acquiring their own latihan premises.

Members have also formed informal networks and interest groups, including a Peace Network, a Spiritual Support Network (originally on Yahoo), and several Facebook groups.

=== Enterprises ===
When Subud first expanded beyond Indonesia, Pak Subuh focused primarily on the spiritual exercise of the latihan. He later encouraged members to engage in entrepreneurial activities, with the suggestion that a portion of profits could be donated to welfare projects and to support the Subud organization.

Subuh explained that the effects of the latihan on the physical body indicate that worship need not be limited to prayer in traditional places of worship. He suggested that ordinary life, when guided by the Power of God, can itself constitute ongoing spiritual practice, creating a dynamic relationship between material and spiritual life. In this context, his encouragement for members to participate in enterprise was intended as a means of putting the principles of the latihan into practical action.

=== Membership ===
Membership in Subud is open to any person aged 17 or older, regardless of their religion or lack of religion. According to Pak Subuh, the latihan is intended for "all of mankind." Individuals with a serious mental illness are generally not initiated as members.

There is typically a waiting period of up to three months before a person may be opened. During this period, the prospective member is expected to meet several times with local helpers to have questions answered and any doubts clarified.

There is no formal membership fee; however, most members contribute voluntarily to the costs associated with renting or maintaining premises where group activities are held.

=== Update ===
Some long-established Subud groups and communities have declined or disbanded. Many longstanding members are aging, and there are relatively few new enquiries or members.

Several factors have been suggested for this trend. Subud has traditionally avoided self-promotion, which may limit its visibility. From the 1950s to 1970s, the movement expanded when a number of books about Subud were available in print, and communities included people of various ages, providing new members with peer networks.

Today, individuals seeking spiritual practices have access to a wide range of options, while Subud remains largely unknown. The traditional three-month introductory period, which historically served as a test of sincerity, may now act as a deterrent in a faster-paced cultural context. As an organization, Subud tends to be cautious regarding change, which presents it with challenges for maintaining membership, supporting group properties, covering running costs, and filling committee positions.

== Bibliography ==
- Chryssides, George D. (1999). Exploring New Religions. London and New York: Continuum. ISBN 0-8264-5959-5.
- Geels, Antoon (1997). Subud and the Javanese mystical tradition. Richmond, Surrey: Curzon Press. ISBN 0-7007-0623-2.
- Hunt, Stephen J. (2003). Alternative Religions: A Sociological Introduction. Aldershot, Hampshire: Ashgate Publishing. ISBN 0-7546-3410-8.
- Mulder, Niels Mysticism & everyday life in contemporary Java : cultural persistence and change Singapore : Singapore University Press, 1978.
- Rofe, H. (1959). The Path of Subud. London: Rider.
- Webb, G. (1995). "Subud". In Miller, T. (ed.). America's Alternative Religions. New York: SUNY Press. pp. 267–275. ISBN 0-7914-2398-0.

=== Primary sources ===
- Pak Subuh (1966), The Basis and Aim of Subud, Subud Publications International (SPI)
- Sumohadiwidjojo, M. S. "Autobiography" ISBN 1-869822-07-2, Subud Publications International (March 1990)
- The International Helpers, "On the Subud Way" ISBN 0-9757497-0-6, (c) The World Subud Association (WSA) 2005
