= Latihan =

Form of spiritual practice

Latihan (from Indonesian latihan kejiwaan; "spiritual exercise") is a form of spiritual practice. It is the principal practice of the Subud organization.

== Origin ==
The origin of the practice is associated with Javanese "kebatinan" or "kejawen" tradition.

== The practice ==
Latihan kejiwaan (or simply latihan) means "spiritual exercise" or "training of the spirit". This exercise is not thought about, learned or trained for; it is unique for each person and the ability to 'receive' it is passed on by being in the presence of another person who already practises it at the 'opening'. About twice a week, Subud members go to a local center to participate in a group latihan, men and women separately. The experience takes place in a room or a hall with open space. After a period of sitting quietly, a 'helper' typically asks the members to stand and relax, and then announces the start of the exercise.

Practitioners are advised to surrender to 'what arises from within', not expecting anything in advance. One is recommended not to focus on any image or recite any mantra, nor to mix the exercise with other activities like meditation or use of drugs, but simply to intend to surrender to the Divine or the will of God. (The term "God" is used here with a broad and inclusive intention. An individual is at liberty to substitute interpretations that they feel more in tune with.) One is not to pay attention to others in the room, each of whom is doing his or her own latihan. During the exercise, practitioners may find that, in terms of physical and emotional expression, they involuntarily move, make sounds, walk around, dance, jump, skip, laugh, cry or whatever. The experience varies greatly for different people, but the practitioner is always wholly conscious throughout and free to stop the exercise at any time.

Outwardly the exercise often manifests as physical movement and vocal activity that vary greatly both over time and between individuals. It proceeds spontaneously, involving neither teacher nor method, being unstructured except for basic rules relating to group practice.

The capacity to engage in latihan the first time, in what is called the "opening", is said to be transmitted by the presence of experienced practitioners. It usually entails an attitude of patience and trust, typically with some preparatory relaxation of thoughts and feelings, and involves the whole human being, not just body, emotions, mind or any other single facet.

It is regarded by practitioners as being of spiritual or psychological benefit, depending on personal interpretation and individual experience though apparently it does not affect all practitioners and may affect some detrimentally. Many practitioners see latihan as a way of direct access to a mystical experience that is compatible with a busy modern lifestyle.

=== Use in Subud ===
While the opinions of Subud's founder are often cited among its members, the organization officially endorses no doctrine regarding the latihan's nature or benefits. Practitioners tend to agree that the exercise is best experienced with minimal theorizing or mental imagery.

Although latihan can be practiced alone, Subud arranges regular practice in group settings. Normally sessions are held two or three times a week and last thirty minutes, with the two sexes segregated. Subud offers formal pragmatic, preliminary advice in relation to commencing the practice. Non-members are not allowed to witness Subud latihan sessions as they are considered private.

Subud's founder speculated that the spontaneous movements which characterise latihan are similar in character to early meetings of the Religious Society of Friends which gave rise to the name Quakers. (Note: It also resembles reports of followers of H. W. L. Poonja and Andrew Cohen, who also report spontaneous awakening while being in their presence.)

== Active meditation ==
The method was later adopted by Osho (Bhagwan Shree Rajneesh), who made use of many spiritual methods. He viewed latihan as potentially beneficial, capable of cleansing the mind, yet incomplete and potentially dangerous to mental health since it involved surrender of self-control. He therefore incorporated it as a stage of longer "active meditations", advocating the maintenance of a "witnessing consciousness", following latihan with a period of complete rest and preceding it with one of several techniques intended to promote an autohypnotic trance, and further recommended that, when practising in groups, both sexes should practise together. Preliminary methods used include listening to quiet music, or else a breathing exercise intended to increase blood carbon dioxide levels followed by fifteen minutes looking at a strobe light while listening to music, both of these running at seven times the rate of the heart-beat in order to create an entrainment to alpha wave brain-state. It may also be followed by a form of wordless prayer. He agreed that it was easiest to learn in the presence of someone already experienced in the method.

== Sources ==
- Briedis, Hassanah (2009), The Latihan of Subud, Dissociation and the Neurology of Spiritual Experience. In: Subud Authors, Subud Vision Volume 2, www.subudvision.org
- Chryssides, George D. (1999), Exploring New Religions, London and New York: Continuum, ISBN 0-8264-5959-5
- Geels, Antoon (1997), Subud and the Javanese mystical tradition, Richmond, Surrey: Curzon Press, ISBN 0-7007-0623-2
- Hunt, Stephen J. (2003), Alternative Religions: A Sociological Introduction, Aldershot, Hampshire: Ashgate Publishing, ISBN 0-7546-3410-8
- Pope, Salamah, ed. (1998), Antidote:Experience of a Spiritual Energy, UK: Subud International Publications, ISBN 1-8698-2203-X
- Webb, Gisela (1995), Miller, T. (ed.), America's Alternative Religions, New York: SUNY Press, ISBN 0-7914-2398-0
