= Pari Center for New Learning =

The Pari Center for New Learning is a non-profit educational center located in the village of Pari in Civitella Paganico of the Province of Grosseto, Italy. The center was directed by F. David Peat, who co-authored the book Science, Order, and Creativity with theoretical physicist David Bohm. The center has hosted, with the support of its renowned fellows from academia and the arts, the academy Accademia dei Pari. It hosts international conferences on the role of trust and ethics in the world of economics and business, and conferences on the relationship between religion and science.

== Origin and aims ==
It was created by F. David Peat and Maureen Doolan in 2000, with the support and assistance of external advisors, of the people of Pari, of Pari's village association Sette Colli and of the comune di Civitella-Paganico.

The center is dedicated to education, learning and research and fosters an interdisciplinary approach linking science, the arts, ethics and spirituality. Above all, the Pari Center for New Learning is dedicated to the principle of "the spirit of place". Its location in a medieval village provides a setting for visitors of the center to pause and think about the future and the values, meaning and direction of contemporary society. The founders intend the wooded countryside and traditional farming methods in the surroundings of the center to draw attention to the importance of ecological considerations in comparison to progress and consumerism.

The Pari Center takes a "gentle" approach to learning, emphasizing human interaction in simple, pleasant surroundings without the intrusion of unnecessary technology. The underlying philosophy and approach is that of Gentle Action laid out in the book by David Peat of the same title.

== Activities ==
The center's activities include residential courses and conferences that reflect the Center's philosophy, opportunities for scholars and researchers to spend extended periods in Pari as well as mentoring given by David Peat and other members of the Center's faculty.

The center hosts several courses or seminars every year.

It has hosted the Accademia dei Pari, the name of which has a double meaning in Italian language, signifying both the academy of the people of Pari and the academy of equals. The fellows of the academy include theoretical physicist Basil Hiley who collaborated over decades with David Bohm, art historian Deborah Klimburg-Salter who has studied the impact of the Sanghata Sutra, theoretical physicist Ignazio Licata, astronomer and space scientist Roger Malina, physicist Roy McWeeny and Paavo Pylkkänen who has published articles on consciousness with Basil Hiley.

It has run international conferences on the role of trust and ethics in the world of economics and business as well as conferences on the relationship between religion and science; one of these is documented in the book The Pari Dialogues: Essays in Science, Religion, Society and the Arts of 2008 by F. David Peat.

In June 2008, the Pari Center for New Learning hosted a conference on The Legacy of David Bohm, which included many collaborators and early students of Bohm as participants.

Along with organisations in Berlin, London, Stockholm, Tromso and Lisbon, the Pari Center for New Learning is partner in the project UniGrowCity, for which it hosted a members' meeting in November 2011. The project, intended to address experienced-based learning for a more sustainable city of the future, was initiated by six organisations in six European countries and is part of the Grundtvig programme on adult education.

The center is associated with Pari Publishing, a small publishing house specialized in science, religion, society, psychology, linguistics and the arts, managed by Eleanor Peat.

== Awards ==
Three times in 2003, 2004 and 2006, the Pari Dialogues hosted by the Pari Center for New Learning were awarded the Local Societies Initiative Supplemental Grant Award by the Metanexus Institute.
