= Bohm Dialogue =

Top scientist works to stop scientism, work being continued by Socrates Cafe Society

Bohm Dialogue (also known as Bohmian Dialogue or "Dialogue in the Spirit of David Bohm") is a freely flowing group conversation in which participants attempt to reach a common understanding, experiencing everyone's point of view fully, equally and nonjudgmentally. This can lead to new and deeper understanding. The purpose is to solve the communication crises that face society, and indeed the whole of human nature and consciousness. It utilizes a theoretical understanding of the way thoughts relate to universal reality. It is named after physicist David Bohm who originally proposed this form of dialogue.

== Bohm's original dialogue ==
=== The theory of dialogue ===
Bohm introduced a concept of dialogue, stating that

dialogue can be considered as a free flow of meaning between people in communication, in the sense of a stream that flows between banks.

These "banks" are understood as representing the various points of view of the participants.

...it may turn out that such a form of free exchange of ideas and information is of fundamental relevance for transforming culture and freeing it of destructive misinformation, so that creativity can be liberated. – David Bohm

A dialogue has no predefined purpose, no agenda, other than that of inquiring into the movement of thought, and exploring the process of "thinking together" collectively. This activity can allow group participants to examine their preconceptions and prejudices, as well as to explore the more general movement of thought. Bohm's intention regarding the suggested minimum number of participants was to replicate a social/cultural dynamic (rather than a family dynamic). This form of dialogue seeks to enable an awareness of why communicating in the verbal sphere is so much more difficult and conflict-ridden than in all other areas of human activity and endeavor.

Dialogue should not be confused with discussion or debate, both of which, says Bohm, suggest working towards a goal or reaching a decision, rather than simply exploring and learning. Meeting without an agenda or fixed objective is done to create a "free space" for something new to happen.

David Bohm said:

Dialogue is really aimed at going into the whole thought process and changing the way the thought process occurs collectively. We haven't really paid much attention to thought as a process. We have engaged in thoughts, but we have only paid attention to the content, not to the process. Why does thought require attention? Everything requires attention, really. If we ran machines without paying attention to them, they would break down. Our thought, too, is a process, and it requires attention, otherwise, it's going to go wrong. (Bohm, "On Dialogue", p. 10.)

Taking reference to the work Science, Order and Creativity by Bohm and F. David Peat, Arleta Griffor – noted by Paavo Pylkkänen for her "deep and extensive knowledge of Bohm's philosophy" and member of the research group of Bohm's collaborator Basil Hiley – underlines the importance of the kind of listening involved in the Bohm dialogue and points to Bohm's statement that

[A] thoroughgoing suspension of tacit individual and cultural infrastructures, in the context of full attention to their contents, frees the mind to move in new ways … The mind is then able to respond to creative new perceptions going beyond the particular points of view that have been suspended.

Griffor emphasizes that in conventional discussion,

[T]he self-defensive activity of each participant's idiosyncrasy […] prevents listening" and that, in contrast, giving full attention to what the other participants mean can free the mind from socio-cultural accumulation, allow a free flow of meaning between people in a dialogue and give rise to shared perception and the creation of shared meaning in the sense of shared significance, intention, purpose and value. It seems then that the main trouble is that the other person is the one who is prejudiced and not listening. After all, it is easy for each one of us to see that other people are 'blocked' about certain questions, so that without being aware of it, they are avoiding the confrontation of contradictions in certain ideas that may be extremely dear to them. The very nature of such a 'block' is, however, that it is a kind of insensitivity or 'anesthesia' about one's own contradictions. Evidently then, what is crucial is to be aware of the nature of one's own 'blocks'. If one is alert and attentive, he can see for example that whenever certain questions arise, there are fleeting sensations of fear, which push him away from consideration of those questions, and of pleasure, which attract his thoughts and cause them to be occupied with other questions. So, one is able to keep away from whatever it is that he thinks may disturb him. And as a result, he can be subtle at defending his own ideas, when he supposes that he is really listening to what other people have to say. When we come together to talk, or otherwise to act in common, can each one of us be aware of the subtle fear and pleasure sensations that 'block' the ability to listen freely?

=== Principles of dialogue ===
1. The group agrees that no group-level decisions will be made in the conversation. "...In the dialogue group we are not going to decide what to do about anything. This is crucial. Otherwise we are not free. We must have an empty space where we are not obliged to anything, nor to come to any conclusions, nor to say anything or not say anything. It's open and free." (Bohm, "On Dialogue", pp. 18–19.)"
2. Each individual agrees to suspend judgement in the conversation. (Specifically, if the individual hears an idea he doesn't like, he does not attack that idea.) "...people in any group will bring to it assumptions, and as the group continues meeting, those assumptions will come up. What is called for is to suspend those assumptions, so that you neither carry them out nor suppress them. You don't believe them, nor do you disbelieve them; you don't judge them as good or bad...(Bohm, "On Dialogue", p. 22.)"
3. As these individuals "suspend judgement" they also simultaneously are as honest and transparent as possible. (Specifically, if the individual has a "good idea" that he might otherwise hold back from the group because it is too controversial, he will share that idea in this conversation.)
4. Individuals in the conversation try to build on other individuals' ideas in the conversation. (The group often comes up with ideas that are far beyond what any of the individuals thought possible before the conversation began.)

=== The experience of a dialogue ===
Twenty to forty participants sit in a circle and engage in free-flowing conversation. A dialogue typically goes on for a few hours (or for a few days in a workshop environment).

Participants "suspend" their beliefs, opinions, impulses, and judgments while speaking together, in order to see the movement of the group's thought processes and what their effects may be.

In such a dialogue, when one person says something, the other person does not, in general, respond with exactly the same meaning as that seen by the first person. Rather, the meanings are only similar and not identical. Thus, when the 2nd person replies, the 1st person sees a Difference between what he meant to say and what the other person understood. On considering this difference, he may then be able to see something new, which is relevant both to his own views and to those of the other person. And so it can go back and forth, with the continual emergence of a new content that is common to both participants. Thus, in a dialogue, each person does not attempt to make common certain ideas or items of information that are already known to him. Rather, it may be said that two people are making something in common, i.e., creating something new together. ((Bohm, On Dialogue, p. 3.))

== Post-Bohm ==
"Bohm Dialogue" has been widely used in the field of organizational development, and has evolved beyond what David Bohm intended: rarely is the group size as large as what Bohm originally recommended, and there are often other numerous subtle differences. Specifically, any method of conversation that claims to be based on the "principles of dialogue as established by David Bohm" can be considered to be a form of Bohm Dialogue.

Usually, the goal of the various incarnations of "Bohm Dialogue" is to get the whole group to have a better understanding of itself. In other words, Bohm Dialogue is used to inform all of the participants about the current state of the group they are in.

=== Incarnations ===
- Chris Harris, the thought leader on Hyperinnovation (2002) and Building Innovative Teams (2003), outlines a multidimensional approach to Dialogue Development, enabling groups to take their collective ideas, knowledge and goals in highly creative, boundary-crossing directions. He says "...it is at the borders between different domains where true creativity, and ultimately innovation occurs ... systems/holistic thinking, mental model sharing/development, and group foresight skills are largely responsible for group communication breakthrough." "Bohm", he says, "may have agreed."
- Peter Senge in his book The Fifth Discipline (1990) recommends a type of dialogue that is based on principles he says originate with Bohm, and is part of his strategy to help groups become "learning organizations".
- Parker Palmer in his book A Hidden Wholeness (2004) seems to advocate a style of dialogue that is almost identical to what Bohm originally recommended. (Palmer calls his technique "Circles of Trust".) Palmer uses his dialogue more for personal spiritual development than for business consultation.
- Holman (1999) explains that Linda Ellinor has used "dialogue like conversation" to establish partnership in the workplace (essentially establishing informal workplace democracy):

"...there is a movement towards what we call shared leadership. Shared leadership refers to what happens as those practicing dialogue over time begin to share in the understanding of collectively held goals and purpose together. Alignment builds. Every individual sees more clearly how he or she uniquely shares and contributes to the output and end results. Formal leaders do not need to direct the activities of subordinates as much. Armed with greater understanding of the larger picture, subordinates simply take independent action when they need to without being dependent on feedback from their manager." (p. 224)

- William Isaacs (1999) claims to be building directly on Bohm's work. He describes many possible techniques and skill sets that can be used to view and enhance dialogue in a group. Isaacs focuses on a four-stage evolutionary-model of a dialogue (pp. 242–290):

Stage one is "Shared Monologues", where group members get used to talking to each other.

Stage two is "Skillful Discussion", where people are learning the skills of dialogue.

Stage three is "Reflective Dialogue", which is approximately Bohm's idea of dialogue.

Stage four is "Generative Dialogue", a special "creative" dialogue Isaacs seeks for his groups.

- Patricia Shaw distances herself from the rest of the Bohm school of dialogue, stating "...I am not trying to foster a special form or discipline of conversation... Rather than inculcating a special discipline of dialogue, I am encouraging perceptions of ensemble improvisation as an organizing craft of communicative action" (Patricia Shaw 2002, p. 164). Shaw's form of dialogue focuses on getting group members to appreciate the different roles each other can play in conversation, in the same way that jazz (improvisational) musicians appreciate each other's unplanned contribution to a performance. Shaw's dialogue variation shows that a simpler, less idealistic approach is possible. For her all conversations are on a continuum, a gray scale that ranges from the highest, purest forms of dialogue to the lowest command-and-control conversations. In this sense dialogue is a property a conversation can have more or less of.

All of the above authors and consultants are considered to be experts in "Bohm Dialogue" (amongst others). This makes Bohm himself only one of many authorities on this subject. Some of these practitioners have made contributions and adaptations completely unforeseen by Bohm himself, making the subject of "Bohm Dialogue" much greater than the dialogue theory Bohm himself originally established, which, Don Factor believes, would have delighted him if he were still alive.

== See also ==
- Appreciative inquiry
- Communicative action
- Dialogue mapping
- Double-loop learning
- Improvisation
- Learning circle
- Nonviolent Communication
- Rogerian argument
- Theory U
