= Basil Hiley =

British quantum physicist (1935–2025)

- Born: Basil James Hiley; 15 November 1935; Burma, British India
- Died: 25 January 2025 (aged 89)
- Education: King's College London
- Awards: Majorana Prize (2012)
- Scientific career
- Fields: Physics; Quantum mechanics
- Workplaces: University of London
- Doctoral advisor: Cyril Domb; Michael Fisher
- Doctoral students: Nicholas A. M. Monk

Basil James Hiley (15 November 1935 – 25 January 2025) was a British physicist and professor emeritus of the University of London.

Long-time colleague of David Bohm, Hiley is known for his work with Bohm on implicate orders and for his work on algebraic descriptions of quantum mechanics in terms of underlying symplectic and orthogonal Clifford algebras. Hiley co-authored the book The Undivided Universe with David Bohm, which is considered the main reference for Bohmian mechanics.

The work of Bohm and Hiley has been characterized as primarily addressing the question "whether we can have an adequate conception of the reality of a quantum system, be this causal or be it stochastic or be it of any other nature" and meeting the scientific challenge of providing a mathematical description of quantum systems that matches the idea of an implicate order.

== Background ==
Basil James Hiley was born November 15, 1935 in Burma, where his father, James Hiley, worked for the military of the British Raj. He moved to Hampshire, England, at the age of twelve, where he attended secondary school. His interest in science was stimulated by his teachers at secondary school and by books, in particular The Mysterious Universe by James Hopwood Jeans and Mr Tompkins in Wonderland by George Gamow.

Hiley performed undergraduate studies at King's College London. In 1962 he obtained his PhD from King's College in condensed matter physics, more specifically on cooperative phenomena in ferromagnets and long chain polymer models, under the supervision of Cyril Domb and Michael Fisher.

Hiley first met David Bohm during a week-end meeting organized by the student society of King's College at Cumberland Lodge, where Bohm held a lecture. In 1961 Hiley was appointed assistant lecturer at Birkbeck College, where Bohm had taken the chair of Theoretical Physics shortly before. Hiley wanted to investigate how physics could be based on a notion of process, and he found that David Bohm held similar ideas. He reports that during the seminars he held together with Roger Penrose he

was particularly fascinated by John Wheeler's "sum over three geometries" ideas that he was using to quantise gravity.

— Hiley,

Hiley worked with David Bohm for many years on fundamental problems of theoretical physics. Initially Bohm's model of 1952 did not feature in their discussions; this changed when Hiley asked himself whether the "Einstein-Schrödinger equation", as Wheeler called it, might be found by studying the full implications of that model. They worked together closely for three decades. Together they wrote many publications, including the book The Undivided Universe: An Ontological Interpretation of Quantum Theory, published 1993, which is now considered the major reference for Bohm's interpretation of quantum theory.

In 1995, Basil Hiley was appointed to the chair in physics at Birkbeck College at the University of London. He was awarded the 2012 Majorana Prize in the category The Best Person in Physics for the algebraic approach to quantum mechanics and furthermore in recognition of "his paramount importance as natural philosopher, his critical and open minded attitude towards the role of science in contemporary culture".

Hiley died on 25 January 2025, at the age of 89.

== Work ==
=== Quantum potential and active information ===
In the 1970s Bohm, Hiley and co-workers at Birkbeck College expanded further on the theory presented by David Bohm in 1952. They suggested to re-express the field equations of physics in a way that is independent of their spacetime description. They interpreted Bell's theorem as a test of spontaneous localization, meaning a tendency of a many-body system to factorize into a product of localized states of its constituent particles, pointing out that such spontaneous localization removes the need for a fundamental role of the measuring apparatus in quantum theory. They proposed that the fundamental new quality introduced by quantum physics is non-locality. In 1975, they presented how in the causal interpretation of the quantum theory introduced by Bohm in 1952 the concept of a quantum potential leads to the notion of an "unbroken wholeness of the entire universe", and they proposed possible routes to a generalization of the approach to relativity by means of a novel concept of time.

Bohm trajectories under the influence of the quantum potential, at the example of an electron going through the two-slit experiment. The resultant trajectories were first presented by Philippidis, Dewdney and Hiley in 1979.

By performing numeric computations on the basis of the quantum potential, Chris Philippidis, Chris Dewdney and Basil Hiley used computer simulations to deduce ensembles of particle trajectories that could account for the interference fringes in the double-slit experiment and worked out descriptions of scattering processes. Their work renewed the interests of physicists in the Bohm interpretation of quantum physics. In 1979, Bohm and Hiley discussed the Aharonov–Bohm effect which had recently found experimental confirmation. They called attention to the importance of the early work of Louis de Broglie on pilot waves, emphasizing his insight and physical intuition and stating that developments based on his ideas aimed at a better understanding than mathematical formalism alone. They offered ways of understanding quantum non-locality and the measurement process, the limit of classicality, interference and quantum tunneling.

They showed how in the Bohm model, introducing the concept of active information, the measurement problem and the collapse of the wave function, could be understood in terms of the quantum potential approach, and that this approach could be extended to relativistic quantum field theories. They described the measurement process and the impossibility of measuring position and momentum simultaneously as follows: "The ѱ field itself changes since it must satisfy the Schrödinger equation, which now contains the interaction between the particle and apparatus, and it is this change that makes it impossible to measure position and momentum together". The collapse of the wave function of the Copenhagen interpretation of quantum theory is explained in the quantum potential approach by the demonstration that information can become inactive in the sense that from then on "all the packets of the multi-dimensional wave function that do not correspond to the actual result of measurement have no effect on the particle".

Summarizing Bohm's and his own interpretation, Hiley has explained that the quantum potential "does not give rise to a mechanical force in the Newtonian sense. Thus while the Newtonian potential drives the particle along the trajectory, the quantum potential organises the form of the trajectories in response to the experimental conditions." The quantum potential can be understood as an aspect of "some kind of self-organising process" involving a basic underlying field. The quantum potential (or information potential) links the quantum system under investigation to the measuring apparatus, thereby giving that system a significance within the context defined by the apparatus. It acts on each quantum particle individually, each particle influencing itself. Hiley cites the wording of Paul Dirac: "Each electron only interferes with itself" and adds: "Somehow the 'quantum force' is a 'private' force. It thus cannot be regarded as a distortion of some underlying sub-quantum medium as was originally suggested by de Broglie". It is independent of field intensity, thus fulfilling a precondition for non-locality, and it carries information about the whole experimental arrangement in which the particle finds itself.

In processes of non-signalling transmission of qubits in a system consisting of multiple particles (a process that is generally called "quantum teleportation" by physicists), active information is transferred from one particle to another, and in the Bohm model this transfer is mediated by the non-local quantum potential.

=== Relativistic quantum field theory ===
With Pan N. Kaloyerou, Hiley extended the quantum potential approach to quantum field theory in Minkowski spacetime. Bohm and Hiley proposed a new interpretation of the Lorentz transformation and considered the relativistic invariance of a quantum theory based on the notion of beables, a term coined by John Bell to distinguish these variables from observables. Hiley and a co-worker later extended the work further to curved spacetime. Bohm and Hiley demonstrated that the non-locality of quantum theory can be understood as limit case of a purely local theory, provided the transmission of active information is allowed to be greater than the speed of light, and that this limit case yields approximations to both quantum theory and relativity.

The Bohm–Hiley approach to relativistic quantum field theory (RQFT) as presented in Bohm and Hiley's book Undivided Universe and in the work of their co-worker Kaloyerou was reviewed and re-interpreted by Abel Miranda, who stated:

I emphasize that Bohm–Hiley ontological reformulation of RQFT always treats Bose fields as continuous distributions in spacetime – basically because these quantum fields have perfectly well-defined classical analogs. The textbook spin-0, spin-1 and spin-2 bosons, such as the Higgs, photons, gluons, electroweak bosons and gravitons [...] are, according to this viewpoint, not "particles" in any naive sense of the word, but just dynamical structural features of coupled continuous scalar, vector, and symmetric tensor fields that first become manifest when interactions with matter particles (elementary or otherwise) occur [...].

=== Implicate orders, pre-space and algebraic structures ===
Much of Bohm and Hiley's work in the 1970s and 1980s has expanded on the notion of implicate, explicate and generative orders proposed by Bohm. This concept is described in the books Wholeness and the Implicate Order by Bohm and Science, Order, and Creativity by Bohm and F. David Peat. The theoretical framework underlying this approach has been developed by the Birkbeck group over the last decades. In 2013 the research group at Birkbeck summarized their over-all approach as follows:

"It is now quite clear that if gravity is to be quantised successfully, a radical change in our understanding of spacetime will be needed. We begin from a more fundamental level by taking the notion of process as our starting point. Rather than beginning with a spacetime continuum, we introduce a structure process which, in some suitable limit, approximates to the continuum. We are exploring the possibility of describing this process by some form of non-commutative algebra, an idea that fits into the general ideas of the implicate order. In such a structure, the non-locality of quantum theory can be understood as a specific feature of this more general a-local background and that locality, and indeed time, will emerge as a special feature of this deeper a-local structure."

As of 1980, Hiley and his co-worker Fabio A. M. Frescura expanded on the notion of an implicate order by building on the work of Fritz Sauter and Marcel Riesz who had identified spinors with minimal left ideals of an algebra. The identification of algebraic spinors with minimal left ideals, which can be seen as a generalization of the ordinary spinor was to become central to the Birkbeck group's work on algebraic approaches to quantum mechanics and quantum field theory. Frescura and Hiley considered algebras that had been developed in the 19th century by the mathematicians Hermann Grassmann, William Rowan Hamilton, and William Kingdon Clifford. As Bohm and his colleagues emphasized, in such an algebraic approach operators and operands are of the same type: "there is no need for the disjoint features of the present mathematical formalism [of quantum theory], namely the operators on the one hand and the state vectors on the other. Rather, one uses only a single type of object, the algebraic element". More specifically, Frescura and Hiley showed how "the states of quantum theory become elements of the minimal ideals of the algebra and [..] the projection operators are just the idempotents which generate these ideals". In a 1981 preprint that remained unpublished for many years, Bohm, P. G. Davies and Hiley presented their algebraic approach in context with the work of Arthur Stanley Eddington. Hiley later pointed out that Eddington attributed to a particle not a metaphysical existence but a structural existence as an idempotent of an algebra, similarly as in process philosophy an object is a system which continuously transforms onto itself. With their approach based on algebraic idempotents, Bohm and Hiley "incorporate Bohr's notion of 'wholeness' and d'Espagnat's concept of 'non-separability' in a very basic way".

In 1981, Bohm and Hiley introduced the "characteristic matrix", a non-Hermitian extension of the density matrix. The Wigner and Moyal transformation of the characteristic matrix yields a complex function, for which the dynamics can be described in terms of a (generalized) Liouville equation with the aid of a matrix operating in phase space, leading to eigenvalues that can be identified with stationary states of motion. From the characteristic matrix, they constructed a further matrix that has only non-negative eigenvalues which can thus be interpreted as a quantum "statistical matrix". Bohm and Hiley thus demonstrated a relation between the Wigner–Moyal approach and Bohm's theory of an implicate order that allows to avoid the problem of negative probabilities. They noted that this work stands in close connection with Ilya Prigogine's proposal of a Liouville space extension of quantum mechanics. They extended this approach further to relativistic phase space by applying the phase space interpretation of Mario Schönberg to the Dirac algebra. Their approach was subsequently applied by Peter R. Holland to fermions and by Alves O. Bolivar to bosons.

In 1984, Hiley and Frescura discussed an algebraic approach to Bohm's notion of implicate and explicit orders: the implicate order is carried by an algebra, the explicate order is contained in the various representations of this algebra, and the geometry of space and time appear at a higher level of abstraction of the algebra. Bohm and Hiley expanded on the concept that "relativistic quantum mechanics can be expressed completely through the interweaving of three basic algebras, the bosonic, the fermionic and the Clifford" and that in this manner "the whole of relativistic quantum mechanics can also be put into an implicate order" as suggested in earlier publications of David Bohm from 1973 and 1980. On this basis, they expressed the twistor theory of Penrose as a Clifford algebra, thereby describing structure and forms of ordinary space as an explicit order that unfolds from an implicate order, the latter constituting a pre-space. The spinor is described mathematically as an ideal in the Pauli Clifford algebra, the twistor as an ideal in the conformal Clifford algebra.

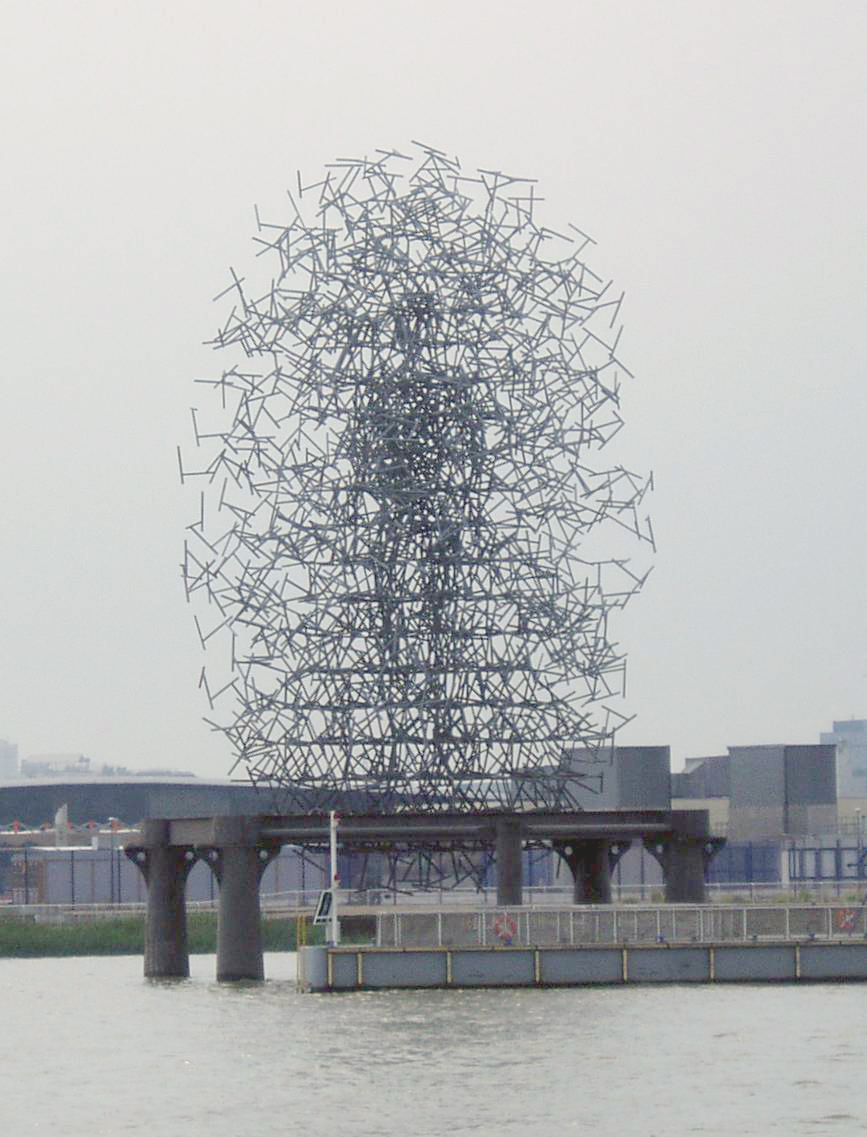
Quantum Cloud by Antony Gormley, influenced by an exchange of thoughts among Hiley and Gormley on algebra and pre-space.

The notion of another order underlying space was not new. Along similar lines, both Gerard 't Hooft and John Archibald Wheeler, questioning whether space-time was the appropriate starting-point for describing physics, had called for a deeper structure as starting point. In particular, Wheeler had proposed a notion of pre-space which he called pregeometry, from which spacetime geometry should emerge as a limiting case. Bohm and Hiley underlined Wheeler's view, yet pointed out that they did not build on the foam-like structure proposed by Wheeler and by Stephen Hawking but rather worked towards a representation of the implicate order in form of an appropriate algebra or other pre-space, with spacetime itself considered part of an explicit order that is connected to pre-space as implicit order. The spacetime manifold and properties of locality and non-locality then arise from an order in such pre-space.

In the view of Bohm and Hiley, "things, such as particles, objects, and indeed subjects, are considered as semi-autonomous quasi-local features of this underlying activity". These features can be considered to be independent only up to a certain level of approximation in which certain criteria are fulfilled. In this picture, the classical limit for quantum phenomena, in terms of a condition that the action function is not much greater than the Planck constant, indicates one such criterion. Bohm and Hiley used the word holomovement for the underlying activity in the various orders together. This term is intended to extend beyond the movement of objects in space and beyond the notion of process, covering movement in a wide context such as for instance the "movement" of a symphony: "a total ordering which involves the whole movement, past and anticipated, at any one moment". This concept, which avowedly has similarities with the notion of organic mechanism of Alfred North Whitehead, underlies Bohm and Hiley's efforts to establish algebraic structures that relate to quantum physics and to find an ordering that describes thought processes and the mind.

They investigated non-locality of spacetime also in terms of the time dimension. In 1985, Bohm and Hiley showed that Wheeler's delayed-choice experiment does not require the existence of the past to be limited to its recording in the present. Hiley and R. E. Callaghan later confirmed this view, which stands in stark contrast to Wheeler's earlier statement that "the past has no existence except as it is recorded in the present", by a detailed trajectory analysis for delayed choice experiments and by an investigation into welcher Weg experiments. Hiley and Callaghan in fact showed that, an interpretation of Wheeler's delayed choice experiment based on Bohm's model, the past is an objective history that cannot be altered retroactively by delayed choice (see also: Bohmian interpretation of Wheeler's delayed choice experiment).

Bohm and Hiley sketched also how Bohm's model could be treated under the point of view of statistical mechanics, and their joint work on this was published in their book (1993) and a subsequent publication (1996).

Hiley has pursued work on algebraic structures in quantum theory throughout his scientific career. After Bohm's death in 1992, he published several papers on how different formulations of quantum physics, including Bohm's, can be brought in context. Hiley also pursued further work on the thought experiments set out by the EPR paradox of Albert Einstein Boris Podolsky and Nathan Rosen and by Hardy's paradox of Lucien Hardy, in particular considering the relation to special relativity.

In the late 1990s, Hiley expanded further on the notion he had developed with Bohm on the description of quantum phenomena in terms of processes. Hiley and his co-worker Marco Fernandes interpret time as an aspect of process that should be represented by a mathematically appropriate description in terms of an algebra of process. For Hiley and Fernandes, time should be considered in terms of "moments" rather than extensionless points in time, in conventional terms implying an integration over time, recalling also that from the "characteristic matrix" of Bohm and Hiley a positive definite probability can be obtained. They model the unfolding of implicate and explicate orders and the evolution of such orders by a mathematical formalism which Hiley has termed the Clifford algebra of process.

==== Projections into shadow manifolds ====
Around the same time, in 1997, Hiley's co-worker Melvin Brown showed that the Bohm interpretation of quantum physics need not rely on a formulation in terms of ordinary space ($x$-space), but can be formulated, alternatively, in terms of momentum space ($p$-space).

Operator equations

$i\hbar\frac{\partial\hat{\rho}}{\partial t} +[\hat{\rho},\hat{H}]_{-}=0$
$\hat{\rho}\frac{\partial\hat{S}}{\partial t} +\frac{1}{2}[\hat{\rho},\hat{H}]_{+}=0$

— Brown and Hiley (2000)

In 2000, Brown and Hiley showed that the Schrödinger equation can be written in a purely algebraic form that is independent of any representation in a Hilbert space. This algebraic description is formulated in terms of two operator equations. The first of these (formulated in terms of the commutator) represents an alternative form of the quantum Liouville equation, which is well known to describe the conservation of probability, the second (formulated in terms of the anticommutator), which they dubbed the "quantum phase equation", describes the conservation of energy. This algebraic description in turn gives rise to descriptions in terms of multiple vector spaces, which Brown and Hiley call "shadow phase spaces" (adopting the term "shadow" from Michał Heller). These shadow phase space descriptions include the descriptions in terms of the x-space of the Bohm trajectory description, of the quantum phase space, and of the p-space. In the classical limit, the shadow phase spaces converge to one unique phase space. In their algebraic formulation of quantum mechanics the equation of motion takes on the same form as in the Heisenberg picture, except that the bra and ket in the bra–ket notation each stand for an element of the algebra and that the Heisenberg time evolution is an inner automorphism in the algebra.

In 2001, Hiley proposed to extend the Heisenberg Lie algebra, which is defined by the pair ($\hat{Q},\hat{P}$) satisfying the commutator bracket $[\hat{Q},\hat{P}]=i\hbar$ and which is nilpotent, by additionally introducing an idempotent into the algebra to yield a symplectic Clifford algebra. This algebra makes it possible to discuss the Heisenberg equation and Schrödinger equation in a representation-free manner. He later noted that the idempotent can be the projection formed by the outer product of the standard ket and the standard bra, which had been presented by Paul Dirac in his work The Principles of Quantum Mechanics.

The set of two operator equations, first derived and published by Brown and Hiley in 2000, was re-derived and expanded upon in Hiley's later publications. Hiley also pointed out that the two operator equations are analogous to the two equations that involve the sine and cosine bracket, and that the quantum phase equation has apparently not been published prior to his work with Brown, except that such an equation was hinted at by P. Carruthers and F. Zachariasen.

Hiley has emphasized that quantum processes cannot be displayed in phase space for reason of lacking commutativity. As Israel Gelfand had shown, commutative algebras allow a unique manifold to be constructed as a sub-space which is dual to the algebra; non-commutative algebras in contrast cannot be associated with a unique underlying manifold. Instead, a non-commutative algebra requires a multiplicity of shadow manifolds. These shadow manifolds can be constructed from the algebra by means of projections into subspaces; however, the projections inevitably lead to distortions, in similar manner as Mercator projections inevitably result in distortions in geographical maps.

The algebraic structure of the quantum formalism can be interpreted as Bohm's implicate order, and shadow manifolds are its necessary consequence: "The order of process by its very essence cannot be displayed in one unique manifest (explicate) order. [...] we can only display some aspects of the process at the expense of others. We are inside looking out."

==== Relation of the de Broglie–Bohm theory to quantum phase space and Wigner–Moyal ====
In 2001, picking up on the "characteristic matrix" developed with Bohm in 1981 and the notion of a "moment" introduced with Fernandes in 1997, Hiley proposed to use a moment as "an extended structure in both space and time" as a basis for a quantum dynamics, to take the place of the notion of a point particle.

Hiley demonstrated the equivalence between Moyal's characteristic function for the Wigner quasi-probability distribution F(x,p,t) and von Neumann's idempotent within the proof of the Stone–von Neumann theorem, concluding: "In consequence, F(x,p,t) is not a probability density function but a specific representation of the quantum mechanical density operator", thus the Wigner–Moyal formalism exactly reproduces the results of quantum mechanics. This confirmed an earlier result by George A. Baker that the quasi-probability distribution can be understood as the density matrix re-expressed in terms of a mean position and momentum of a "cell" in phase space, and furthermore revealed that the Bohm interpretation arises from the dynamics of these "cells" if the particle is considered to be at the center of the cell. Hiley pointed out that the equations defining the Bohm approach can be taken to be implicit in certain equations of the 1949 publication by José Enrique Moyal on the phase space formulation of quantum mechanics; he emphasized that this link between the two approaches could be of relevance for constructing a quantum geometry.

In 2005, building on his work with Brown, Hiley showed that the construction of subspaces allows the Bohm interpretation to be understood in terms of the choice of the x-representation as shadow phase space as one particular choice among an infinite number of possible shadow phase spaces. Hiley noted a conceptual parallel in the demonstration given by mathematician Maurice A. de Gosson that "the Schrödinger equation can be shown rigorously to exist in the covering groups of the symplectic group of classical physics and the quantum potential arises by projecting down onto the underlying group". More succinctly yet, Hiley and Gosson later stated: The classical world lives in a symplectic space, while the quantum world unfolds in the covering space. In mathematical terms, the covering group of the symplectic group is the metaplectic group, and De Gosson summarizes the mathematical reasons for the impossibility of constructing simultaneous position and momentum representations as follows: "Hiley's 'shadow phase space' approach is a reflection of the fact that we cannot construct a global chart for the metaplectic group, when it is viewed as a Lie group, that is, as a manifold equipped with a continuous algebraic structure". In Hiley's framework, the quantum potential arises as "a direct consequence of projecting the non-commutative algebraic structure onto a shadow manifold" and as a necessary feature which ensures that both energy and momentum are conserved. Similarly, the Bohm and the Wigner approach are shown to be two different shadow phase space representations.

With these results, Hiley gave evidence to the notion that the ontology of implicate and explicate orders could be understood as a process described in terms of an underlying non-commutative algebra, from which spacetime could be abstracted as one possible representation. The non-commutative algebraic structure is identified with an implicate order, and its shadow manifolds with the sets of explicate orders that are consistent with that implicate order.

Here emerges, in Hiley's words, "a radically new way of looking at the way quantum processes enfold in time", built on the work of Bohm and Hiley in the 1980s: in this school of thought, processes of movement can be seen as automorphisms within and between inequivalent representations of the algebra. In the first case, the transformation is an inner automorphism, which is a way of expressing the enfolding and unfolding movement in terms of potentialities of the process; in the second case it is an outer automorphism, or transformation to a new Hilbert space, which is a way of expressing an actual change.

==== Hierarchy of Clifford algebras ====
Clifford algebras Cl_{p,q} and wave equations
algebra	signature	equation
Cl_{4,2}	+, +, +, +, −, −	Twistor	twistor
Cl_{1,3}	+, −, −, −	Dirac	relativistic spin-1/2
Cl_{3,0}	+, +, +	Pauli	spin-1/2
Cl_{0,1}	−	Schrödinger	spin-0

Hiley expanded on the notion of a process algebra as proposed by Hermann Grassmann and the ideas of distinction of Louis H. Kauffman. He took reference to the vector operators introduced by Mário Schönberg in 1957 and by Marco Fernandes in his PhD thesis of 1995, who had constructed orthogonal Clifford algebras for certain pairs of dual Grassmann algebras. Adopting a similar approach, Hiley constructed algebraic spinors as minimal left ideals of a process algebra built on the Kauffman's notion of distinction. By nature of their construction, these algebraic spinors are both spinors and elements of that algebra. Whereas they can be mapped (projected) into an external Hilbert space of ordinary spinors of the quantum formalism in order to recover the conventional quantum dynamics, Hiley emphasizes that the dynamic algebraic structure can be exploited more fully with the algebraic spinors than with the ordinary spinors. In this aim, Hiley introduced a Clifford density element expressed in terms of left and right minimal ideals of a Clifford algebra, analogous to the density matrix expressed as an outer product in bra–ket notation in conventional quantum mechanics. On this basis Hiley showed how three Clifford algebras Cl_{0,1}, Cl_{3,0}, Cl_{1,3} form a hierarchy of Clifford algebras over the real numbers that describe the dynamics of the Schrödinger, Pauli and Dirac particles, respectively.

Using this approach to describe relativistic particle quantum mechanics, Hiley and R. E. Callaghan presented a complete relativistic version of the Bohm model for the Dirac particle in analogy to Bohm's approach to the non-relativistic Schrödinger equation, thereby refuting the long-standing misconception that the Bohm model could not be applied in the relativistic domain. Hiley pointed out that the Dirac particle has a 'quantum potential' which is the exact relativistic generalisation of the quantum potential found originally by de Broglie and Bohm. Within the same hierarchy, the twistor of Roger Penrose links to the conformal Clifford algebra Cl_{4,2} over the reals, and what Hiley calls the Bohm energy and the Bohm momentum arises directly from the standard energy-momentum tensor. The technique developed by Hiley and his co-workers demonstrates

"that quantum phenomena per se can be entirely described in terms of Clifford algebras taken over the reals without the need to appeal to specific representation in terms of wave functions in a Hilbert space. This removes the necessity of using Hilbert space and all the physical imagery that goes with the use of the wave function".

This result is in line with Hiley's striving for a purely algebraic approach to quantum mechanics that is not a priori defined on any external vector space. In this purely algebraic approach, the information normally contained in the wave function is encoded in an element of a minimal left ideal of the algebra.

Hiley refers to Bohm's ink droplet analogy for a rather easily understandable analogy of the notion of implicate and explicate order. Regarding the algebraic formulation of the implicate order, he has stated: "An important new general feature that emerges from these considerations is the possibility that not everything can be made explicit at a given time" and adding: 'Within the Cartesian order, complementarity seems totally mysterious. There exists no structural reason as to why these incompatibilities exist. Within the notion of the implicate order, a structural reason emerges and provides a new way of searching for explanations."

Hiley has worked with Maurice A. de Gosson on the relation between classical and quantum physics, presenting a mathematical derivation of the Schrödinger equation from Hamiltonian mechanics. Together with mathematicians Ernst Binz and Maurice A. de Gosson, Hiley showed how "a characteristic Clifford algebra emerges from each (2n-dimensional) phase space" and discussed relations of quaternion algebra, symplectic geometry and quantum mechanics.

==== Observed trajectories and their algebraic description ====
In 2011, de Gosson and Hiley showed that when in Bohm's model a continuous observation of a trajectory is performed, the observed trajectory is identical to the classical particle trajectory. This finding puts the Bohm model in connection to the well-known quantum Zeno effect. They confirmed this finding when they showed that the quantum potential enters into the approximation for the quantum propagator only on time scales of the order of $O(\Delta t^2)$, which means that a continuously observed particle behaves classically and furthermore that the quantum trajectory converges to a classical trajectory if the quantum potential decreases with time.

Later in 2011, for the first time experimental results were published that showed paths that display the properties expected for Bohm trajectories. More specifically, photon trajectories were observed by means of weak measurements in a double-slit interferometer, and these trajectories displayed the qualitative features that had been predicted ten years earlier by Partha Ghose for Bohm trajectories. The same year, Hiley showed that a description of weak processes – "weak" in the sense of weak measurements – can be included in his framework of an algebraic description of quantum processes by extending the framework to include not only (orthogonal) Clifford algebras but also the Moyal algebra, a symplectic Clifford algebra.

Glen Dennis, de Gosson and Hiley, expanding further on de Gosson's notion of quantum blobs, emphasized the relevance of a quantum particle's internal energy – in terms of its kinetic energy as well as its quantum potential – with regard to the particle's extension in phase space.

In 2018, Hiley showed that the Bohm trajectories are to be interpreted as the mean momentum flow of a set of individual quantum processes, not as the path of an individual particle, and related the Bohm trajectories to Richard Feynman's path integral formulation as an average of an ensemble of Feynman paths.

=== Relations to other work ===
Hiley has repeatedly discussed the reasons for which the Bohm interpretation has met resistance, these reasons relating for instance to the role of the quantum potential term and to assumptions on particle trajectories. He has shown how the energy–momentum-relations in the Bohm model can be obtained directly from the energy–momentum tensor of quantum field theory. He has referred to this as "a remarkable discovery, so obvious that I am surprised we didn't spot it sooner", pointing out that on this basis the quantum potential constitutes the missing energy term that is required for local energy–momentum conservation. In Hiley's view the Bohm model and Bell's inequalities allowed a debate on the notion of non-locality in quantum physics or, in Niels Bohr's words, wholeness to surface.

For his purely algebraic approach, Hiley takes reference to foundations in the work of Gérard Emch, the work of Rudolf Haag on local quantum field theory, and the work of Ola Bratteli and D.W. Robertson. He points out that the algebraic mental representation allows to establish a connection to the thermo field dynamics of Hiroomi Umezawa, using a bialgebra constructed from a two-time quantum theory. Hiley has stated that his recent focus on noncommutative geometry appears to be very much in line with the work of Fred van Oystaeyen on noncommutative topology.

Ignazio Licata cites Bohm and Hiley's approach as formulating "a quantum event as the expression of a deeper quantum process" that connects a description in terms of space-time with a description in non-local, quantum mechanical terms. Hiley is cited, together with Whitehead, Bohr and Bohm, for the "stance of elevating processes to a privileged role in theories of physics". His view of process as fundamental has been seen as similar to the approach taken by the physicist Lee Smolin. This stands quite in contrast to other approaches, in particular to the blockworld approach in which spacetime is static.

Philosopher Paavo Pylkkänen, Ilkka Pättiniemi and Hiley are of the view that Bohm's emphasis on notions such as "structural process", "order" and "movement" as fundamental in physics point to some form of scientific structuralism, and that Hiley's work on symplectic geometry, which is in line with the algebraic approach initiated by Bohm and Hiley, "can be seen as bringing Bohm's 1952 approach closer to scientific structuralism".

==== Mind and matter ====
Hiley and Pylkkänen addressed the question of the relation between mind and matter by the hypothesis of an active information contributing to quantum potential. Recalling notions underlying Bohm's approach, Hiley emphasises that active information "informs" in the sense of a literal meaning of the word: it "induces a change of form from within", and "this active side of the notion of information [...] seems to be relevant both to material processes and to thought". He emphasizes: "even though the quantum level may be analogous to the human mind only in a rather limited way, it does help to understand the interlevel relationships if there are some common features, such as the activity of information, shared by the different levels. The idea is not to reduce everything to the quantum level but rather to propose a hierarchy of levels, which makes room for a more subtle notion of determinism and chance".

Referring to two fundamental notions of René Descartes, Hiley states that "if we can give up the assumption that space-time is absolutely necessary for describing physical processes, then it is possible to bring the two apparently separate domains of res extensa and res cogitans into one common domain", and he adds that "by using the notion of process and its description by an algebraic structure, we have the beginnings of a descriptive form that will enable us to understand quantum processes and will also enable us to explore the relation between mind and matter in new ways".

In Bohm and Hiley's work on implicate and explicate order, mind and matter are considered to be different aspects of the same process.

"Our proposal is that in the brain there is a manifest (or physical) side and a subtle (or mental) side acting at various levels. At each level, we can regard one side the manifest or material side, while the other is regarded as subtle or mental side. The material side involves electrochemical processes of various kinds, it involves neuron activity and so on. The mental side involves the subtle or virtual activities that can be actualised by active information mediating between the two sides.
These sides [...] are two aspects of the same process. [...] what is subtle at one level can become what is manifest at the next level and so on. In other words if we look at the mental side, this too can be divided into a relatively stable and manifest side and a yet more subtle side. Thus there is no real division between what is manifest and what is subtle and in consequence there is no real division between mind and matter".

In this context, Hiley spoke of his aim of finding "an algebraic description of those aspects of this implicate order where mind and matter have their origins".

Hiley also worked with biologist Brian Goodwin on a process view of biological life, with an alternate view on Darwinism.

== Honors and awards ==
Hiley received the Majorana Prize by the Electronic Journal of Theoretical Physics for "Best person in physics" in 2012.

== Publications ==
Overview articles

- Hiley, Basil J.; Dennis, Glen (2024). "de Broglie, General Covariance and a Geometric Background to Quantum Mechanics". Symmetry. 16 (67): 67. Bibcode:2024Symm...16...67H. doi:10.3390/sym16010067.
- Hiley, Basil J.; Dennis, Glen; de Gosson, Maurice A. (2022). "The role of geometric and dynamical phases in the Dirac–Bohm picture". Annals of Physics. 438 168759. Bibcode:2022AnPhy.43868759H. doi:10.1016/j.aop.2022.168759.
- B. J. Hiley (2016). "The Algebraic Way". Beyond Peaceful Coexistence. pp. 1–25. arXiv:1602.06071. doi:10.1142/9781783268320_0002. ISBN 978-1-78326-831-3. S2CID 119284839.
- B. J. Hiley (20 September 2016). "Aspects of Algebraic Quantum Theory: a Tribute to Hans Primas". In Harald Atmanspacher; Ulrich Müller-Herold (eds.). From Chemistry to Consciousness: The Legacy of Hans Primas. Springer. pp. 111–125. arXiv:1602.06077. doi:10.1007/978-3-319-43573-2_7. ISBN 978-3-319-43573-2. S2CID 118548614.
- Hiley, B. J. (2013). "Bohmian Non-commutative Dynamics: History and New Developments". arXiv:1303.6057 [quant-ph].
- B. J. Hiley: Particles, fields, and observers. In: Baltimore, D., Dulbecco, R., Jacob, F., Levi-Montalcini, R. (eds.) Frontiers of Life, vol. 1, pp. 89–106. Academic Press, New York (2002)

Books

- David Bohm, Basil Hiley: The Undivided Universe: An Ontological Interpretation of Quantum Theory, Routledge, 1993, ISBN 0-415-06588-7
- F. David Peat (Editor) and Basil Hiley (Editor): Quantum Implications: Essays in Honour of David Bohm, Routledge & Kegan Paul Ltd, London & New York, 1987 (edition of 1991 ISBN 978-0-415-06960-1)

Other

- Foreword to: "The Principles of Newtonian and Quantum Mechanics – The Need for Planck's Constant, h" by Maurice A. de Gosson, Imperial College Press, World Scientific Publishing, 2001, ISBN 1-86094-274-1
- Foreword to the 1996 edition of: "The Special Theory of Relativity" by David Bohm, Routledge, ISBN 0-203-20386-0
- Hiley, B. J. (1997). "David Joseph Bohm. 20 December 1917--27 October 1992: Elected F.R.S. 1990". Biographical Memoirs of Fellows of the Royal Society. 43: 107–131. doi:10.1098/rsbm.1997.0007. JSTOR 770328. S2CID 70366771.
