= Holism in science =

Approach to research that emphasizes the study of complex systems

Holism in science, holistic science, or methodological holism is an approach to research that emphasizes the study of complex systems. Systems are approached as coherent wholes whose component parts are best understood in context and in relation to both each other and to the whole. Holism typically stands in contrast with reductionism, which describes systems by dividing them into smaller components in order to understand them through their elemental properties.

The holism-individualism dichotomy is especially evident in conflicting interpretations of experimental findings across the social sciences, and reflects whether behavioural analysis begins at the systemic, macro-level (ie. derived from social relations) or the component micro-level (ie. derived from individual agents).

== Overview ==
David Deutsch calls holism anti-reductionist and refers to the concept of thinking as the only legitimate way to think about science in as a series of emergent, or higher level phenomena. He argues that neither approach is purely correct.

Two aspects of Holism are:

1. The way of doing science, sometimes called "whole to parts", which focuses on observation of the specimen within its ecosystem first before breaking down to study any part of the specimen.
2. The idea that the scientist is not a passive observer of an external universe but rather a participant in the system.

Proponents claim that Holistic science is naturally suited to subjects such as ecology, biology, physics and the social sciences, where complex, non-linear interactions are the norm. These are systems where emergent properties arise at the level of the whole that cannot be predicted by focusing on the parts alone, which may make mainstream, reductionist science ill-equipped to provide understanding beyond a certain level. This principle of emergence in complex systems is often captured in the phrase ′the whole is greater than the sum of its parts′. Living organisms are an example: no knowledge of all the chemical and physical properties of matter can explain or predict the functioning of living organisms. The same happens in complex social human systems, where detailed understanding of individual behaviour cannot predict the behaviour of the group, which emerges at the level of the collective. The phenomenon of emergence may impose a theoretical limit on knowledge available through reductionist methodology, arguably making complex systems natural subjects for holistic approaches.

Science journalist John Horgan has expressed this view in the book The End of Science. He wrote that a certain pervasive model within holistic science, self-organized criticality, for example, "is not really a theory at all. Like punctuated equilibrium, self-organized criticality is merely a description, one of many, of the random fluctuations, the noise, permeating nature." By the theorists' own admissions, he said, such a model "can generate neither specific predictions about nature nor meaningful insights. What good is it, then?"

One of the reasons that holistic science attracts supporters is that it seems to offer a progressive, 'socio-ecological' view of the world, but Alan Marshall's book The Unity of Nature offers evidence to the contrary; suggesting holism in science is not 'ecological' or 'socially-responsive' at all, but regressive and repressive.

== Examples in various fields of science ==
=== Physical science ===
==== In physics ====
Richard Healey offered a modal interpretation and used it to present a model account of the puzzling correlations which portrays them as resulting from the operation of a process that violates both spatial and spatiotemporal separability. He argued that, on this interpretation, the nonseparability of the process is a consequence of physical property holism; and that the resulting account yields genuine understanding of how the correlations come about without any violation of relativity theory or Local Action. Subsequent work by Clifton, Dickson and Myrvold cast doubt on whether the account can be squared with relativity theory’s requirement of Lorentz invariance but leaves no doubt of an spatially entangled holism in the theory. Paul Davies and John Gribbin further observe that Wheeler's delayed choice experiment shows how the quantum world displays a sort of holism in time as well as space.

In the holistic approach of David Bohm, any collection of quantum objects constitutes an indivisible whole within an implicate and explicate order. Bohm said there is no scientific evidence to support the dominant view that the universe consists of a huge, finite number of minute particles, and offered instead a view of undivided wholeness: "ultimately, the entire universe (with all its 'particles', including those constituting human beings, their laboratories, observing instruments, etc.) has to be understood as a single undivided whole, in which analysis into separately and independently existent parts has no fundamental status".

==== Chaos and complexity ====
Scientific holism holds that the behavior of a system cannot be perfectly predicted, no matter how much data is available. Natural systems can produce surprisingly unexpected behavior, and it is suspected that behavior of such systems might be computationally irreducible, which means it would not be possible to even approximate the system state without a full simulation of all the events occurring in the system. Key properties of the higher level behavior of certain classes of systems may be mediated by rare "surprises" in the behavior of their elements due to the principle of interconnectivity, thus evading predictions except by brute force simulation.

==== Ecology ====
Holistic thinking can be applied to ecology, combining biological, chemical, physical, economic, ethical, and political insights. The complexity grows with the area, so that it is necessary to reduce the characteristic of the view in other ways, for example to a specific time of duration.

==== Medicine ====
In primary care the term "holistic," has been used to describe approaches that take into account social considerations and other intuitive judgements. The term holism, and so-called approaches, appear in psychosomatic medicine in the 1970s, when they were considered one possible way to conceptualize psychosomatic phenomena. Instead of charting one-way causal links from psyche to soma, or vice versa, it aimed at a systemic model, where multiple biological, psychological and social factors were seen as interlinked.

Other, alternative approaches in the 1970s were psychosomatic and somatopsychic approaches, which concentrated on causal links only from psyche to soma, or from soma to psyche, respectively. At present it is commonplace in psychosomatic medicine to state that psyche and soma cannot really be separated for practical or theoretical purposes.

The term systems medicine first appeared in 1992 and takes an integrative approach to all of the body and environment.

=== Social science ===
==== Economics ====
Some economists use a causal holism theory in their work. That is they view the discipline in the manner of Ludwig Wittgenstein and claim that it can't be defined by necessary and sufficient conditions.

==== Education reform ====
The Taxonomy of Educational Objectives identifies many levels of cognitive functioning, which it is claimed may be used to create a more holistic education. In authentic assessment, rather than using computers to score multiple choice tests, a standards based assessment uses trained scorers to score open-response items using holistic scoring methods. In projects such as the North Carolina Writing Project, scorers are instructed not to count errors, or count numbers of points or supporting statements. The scorer is instead instructed to judge holistically whether "as a whole" is it more a "2" or a "3". Critics question whether such a process can be as objective as computer scoring, and the degree to which such scoring methods can result in different scores from different scorers.

==== Anthropology ====
Anthropology is holistic in two senses. First, it is concerned with all human beings across times and places, and with all dimensions of humanity (evolutionary, biophysical, sociopolitical, economic, cultural, psychological, etc.) Further, many academic programs following this approach take a "four-field" approach to anthropology that encompasses physical anthropology, archeology, linguistics, and cultural anthropology or social anthropology.

Some anthropologists disagree, and consider holism to be an artifact from 19th century social evolutionary thought that inappropriately imposes scientific positivism upon cultural anthropology.

The term "holism" is additionally used within social and cultural anthropology to refer to a methodological analysis of a society as a whole, in which component parts are treated as functionally relative to each other. One definition says: "as a methodological ideal, holism implies ... that one does not permit oneself to believe that our own established institutional boundaries (e.g. between politics, sexuality, religion, economics) necessarily may be found also in foreign societies."

==== Psychology of perception ====
A major holist movement in the early twentieth century was gestalt psychology. The claim was that perception is not an aggregation of atomic sense data but a field, in which there is a figure and a ground. Background has holistic effects on the perceived figure. Gestalt psychologists included Wolfgang Koehler, Max Wertheimer, Kurt Koffka. Koehler claimed the perceptual fields corresponded to electrical fields in the brain. Karl Lashley did experiments with gold foil pieces inserted in monkey brains purporting to show that such fields did not exist. However, many of the perceptual illusions and visual phenomena exhibited by the gestaltists were taken over (often without credit) by later perceptual psychologists. Gestalt psychology had influence on Fritz Perls' gestalt therapy, although some old-line gestaltists opposed the association with counter-cultural and New Age trends later associated with gestalt therapy. Gestalt theory was also influential on phenomenology. Aron Gurwitsch wrote on the role of the field of consciousness in gestalt theory in relation to phenomenology. Maurice Merleau-Ponty made much use of holistic psychologists such as work of Kurt Goldstein in his "Phenomenology of Perception."

==== Teleological psychology ====
Alfred Adler believed that the individual (an integrated whole expressed through a self-consistent unity of thinking, feeling, and action, moving toward an unconscious, fictional final goal), must be understood within the larger wholes of society, from the groups to which he belongs (starting with his face-to-face relationships), to the larger whole of mankind. The recognition of our social embeddedness and the need for developing an interest in the welfare of others, as well as a respect for nature, is at the heart of Adler's philosophy of living and principles of psychotherapy.

Edgar Morin, the French philosopher and sociologist, can be considered a holist based on the transdisciplinary nature of his work.

== Skeptical reception ==
According to skeptics, the phrase "holistic science" is often misused by pseudosciences. In the book Science and Pseudoscience in Clinical Psychology it's noted that "Proponents of pseudoscientific claims, especially in organic medicine, and mental health, often resort to the "mantra of holism" to explain away negative findings. When invoking the mantra, they typically maintain that scientific claims can be evaluated only within the context of broader claims and therefore cannot be evaluated in isolation." This is an invocation of Karl Popper's demarcation problem and in a posting to Ask a Philosopher Massimo Pigliucci clarifies Popper by positing, "Instead of thinking of science as making progress by inductive generalization (which doesn’t work because no matter how many times a given theory may have been confirmed thus far, it is always possible that new, contrary, data will emerge tomorrow), we should say that science makes progress by conclusively disconfirming theories that are, in fact, wrong."

Victor J. Stenger states that "holistic healing is associated with the rejection of classical, Newtonian physics. Yet, holistic healing retains many ideas from eighteenth and nineteenth century physics. Its proponents are blissfully unaware that these ideas, especially superluminal holism, have been rejected by modern physics as well".

Some quantum mystics interpret the wave function of quantum mechanics as a vibration in a holistic ether that pervades the universe and wave function collapse as the result of some cosmic consciousness. This is a misinterpretation of the effects of quantum entanglement as a violation of relativistic causality and quantum field theory.

== See also ==
- Antireductionism
- Emergence
- Holarchy
- Holism
- Holism in ecological anthropology
- Holistic management
- Holistic health
- Holon (philosophy)
- Interdisciplinarity
- Organicism
- Scientific reductionism
- Systems thinking
