= Implicate =

Implicate can refer to:

- Implicature, what is suggested or implied with an utterance, even though it is not literally expressed
- Implicate order, a concept in quantum theory
