= Maurice A. de Gosson =

Austrian mathematician and mathematical physicist

Maurice de Gosson
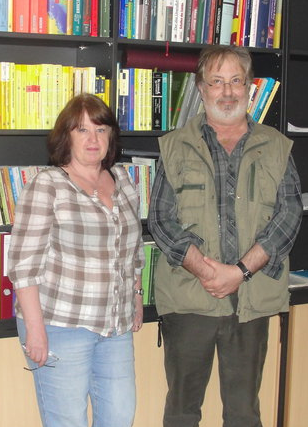
- Maurice and Charlyne de Gosson
- Born: 13 March 1948 (age 78); Berlin, Germany
- Education: University of Nice; University of Paris 6
- Known for: Applications of the principle of the symplectic camel to physics
- Spouse: Charlyne de Gosson
- Scientific career
- Fields: Harmonic analysis, Symplectic geometry, Quantum mechanics
- Website: mauricedegosson.com

Maurice A. de Gosson (born 13 March 1948), (also known as Maurice Alexis de Gosson de Varennes) is an Austrian mathematician and mathematical physicist, born in Berlin. He is currently a Senior Researcher at the Numerical Harmonic Analysis Group (NuHAG) of the University of Vienna.

== Work ==
After completing his PhD in microlocal analysis at the University of Nice in 1978 under the supervision of Jacques Chazarain, de Gosson soon became fascinated by Jean Leray's Lagrangian analysis. Under Leray's tutorship de Gosson completed a Habilitation à Diriger des Recherches en Mathématiques at the University of Paris 6 (1992). During this period he specialized in the study of the Leray–Maslov index and in the theory of the metaplectic group, and their applications to mathematical physics. In 1998 de Gosson met Basil Hiley, who triggered his interest in conceptual questions in quantum mechanics. Basil Hiley wrote a foreword to de Gosson's book The Principles of Newtonian and Quantum Mechanics (Imperial College Press, London). After having spent several years in Sweden as Associate Professor and Professor in Sweden, de Gosson was appointed in 2006 to the Numerical Harmonic Analysis Group of the University of Vienna, created by Hans Georg Feichtinger (see www.nuhag.eu). He currently works in symplectic methods in harmonic analysis, and on conceptual questions in quantum mechanics, often in collaboration with Basil Hiley.

== Visiting positions ==
Maurice de Gosson has held longer visiting positions at Yale University, University of Colorado in Boulder (Ulam Visiting professor), University of Potsdam, Albert-Einstein-Institut (Golm), Max-Planck-Institut für Mathematik (Bonn), Université Paul Sabatier (Toulouse), Jacobs Universität (Bremen)

== Symplectic camel ==
Maurice de Gosson was the first to prove that Mikhail Gromov's symplectic non-squeezing theorem (also called the Principle of "the Symplectic Camel") allowed the derivation of a classical uncertainty principle formally totally similar to the Robertson–Schrödinger uncertainty relations (i.e. the Heisenberg inequalities in a stronger form where the covariances are taken into account). This rather unexpected result was discussed in the media.

== Quantum blobs ==
In 2003, Gosson introduced the notion of quantum blobs, which are defined in terms of symplectic capacities and are invariant under canonical transformations. Shortly after, he showed that Gromov's non-squeezing theorem allows a coarse-graining of phase space by such quantum blobs (or symplectic quantum cells), each described by a mean momentum and a mean position:

The quantum blob is the image of a phase space ball with radius $\sqrt{ \hbar }$ by a (linear) symplectic transformation.

and

"Quantum blobs are the smallest phase space units of phase space compatible with the uncertainty principle of quantum mechanics and having the symplectic group as group of symmetries. Quantum blobs are in a bijective correspondence with the squeezed coherent states from standard quantum mechanics, of which they are a phase space picture."

Their invariance property distinguishes de Gosson's quantum blobs from the "quantum cells" known in thermodynamics, which are units of phase space with a volume of the size of the Planck constant h to the power of 3.

Together with G. Dennis and Basil Hiley, de Gosson laid out examples of how the quantum blob can be seen as a "blow-up" of a particle in phase space. To demonstrate this, they picked up on "Fermi's trick" which allows identifying an arbitrary wavefunction as a stationary state for some Hamiltonian operator. They showed that this blow-up requires internal energy that comes from the particle itself, involving the kinetic energy and David Bohm's quantum potential.

In the classical limit, the quantum blob becomes a point particle.

== Influence ==
De Gosson's notion of quantum blobs has given rise to a proposal for a new formulation of quantum mechanics, which is derived from postulates on quantum-blob-related limits to the extent and localization of quantum particles in phase space; this proposal is strengthened by the development of a phase space approach that applies to both quantum and classical physics, where a quantum-like evolution law for observables can be recovered from the classical Hamiltonian in a non-commutative phase space, where x and p are (non-commutative) c-numbers, not operators.

== Publications ==
=== Books ===
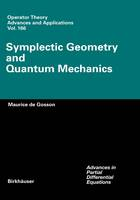
Symplectic Geometry and Quantum Mechanics (2006)

- Symplectic Methods in Harmonic Analysis and Applications to Mathematical Physics; Birkhäuser (2011) ISBN 3-7643-9991-0
- Symplectic Geometry and Quantum Mechanics. Birkhäuser, Basel, series "Operator Theory: Advances and Applications" (2006) ISBN 3-7643-7574-4
- The Principles of Newtonian and Quantum Mechanics: the Need for Planck's Constant h; with a foreword by B. Hiley. Imperial College Press (2001) ISBN 1-86094-274-1
- Maslov Classes, Metaplectic Representation and Lagrangian Quantization. Mathematical Research 95, Wiley VCH (1997), ca 190 pages ISBN 3-527-40087-7
- In preparation: Mathematical and Physical Aspects of Quantum Processes (with Basil Hiley)
- In preparation: Pseudo-Differential operators and Quantum Mechanics

=== Selected recent papers ===
- The symplectic egg. arXiv:1208.5969v1, to appear in American Journal of Physics (2013)
- Symplectic Covariance Properties for Shubin and Born Jordan Pseudo-Differential Operators. Trans. Amer. Math. Soc. (2012) (abridged version: arXiv:1104.5198v1 submitted 27 April 2011)
- A pseudo-differential calculus on non-standard symplectic space; Spectral and regularity results in modulation spaces. Journal de Mathématiques Pures et Appliquées Volume 96, Issue 5, November 2011, Pages 423-445
- (With B. Hiley) Imprints of the Quantum World in Classical Mechanics. Foundations of Physics (26 February 2011), pp. 1–22, doi:10.1007/s10701-011-9544-5 (abstract, arXiv:1001.4632 submitted 26 January 2010, version of 15 December 2010)
- (with F. Luef) Preferred quantization rules: Born-Jordan versus Weyl. The pseudo-differential point of view. J. Pseudo-Differ. Oper. Appl. 2 (2011), no. 1, 115–139
- (with N. Dias F. Luef, J. Prata, João) A deformation quantization theory for noncommutative quantum mechanics. J. Math. Phys. 51 (2010), no. 7, 072101, 12 pp.
- (with F. Luef) Symplectic capacities and the geometry of uncertainty: the irruption of symplectic topology in classical and quantum mechanics.Phys. Rep. 484 (2009), no. 5, 131–179
- The symplectic camel and the uncertainty principle: the tip of an iceberg? Found. Phys. 39 (2009), no. 2, 194–214
- On the usefulness of an index due to Leray for studying the intersections of Lagrangian and symplectic paths. J. Math. Pures Appl. (9) 91(2009), no. 6, 598–613.
- Spectral properties of a class of generalized Landau operators. Comm. Partial Differential Equations 33 (2008), no. 10–12, 2096–2104
- Metaplectic representation, Conley–Zehnder index, and Weyl calculus on phase space. Rev. Math. Phys. 19 (2007), no. 10, 1149–1188.
- Symplectically covariant Schrödinger equation in phase space. Journal of Physics A, vol. 38 (2005), no. 42, pp. 9263, doi:10.1088/0305-4470/38/42/007, arXiv:math-ph/0505073v3 submitted 27 May 2005, version of 30 July 2005
