= Pregeometry =

In mathematics and physics, pregeometry has several meanings:

- Pregeometry (model theory), another name for a matroid
- Pregeometry (physics), a structure from which geometry arises
