= Michel Van den Bergh =

Belgian mathematician and professor

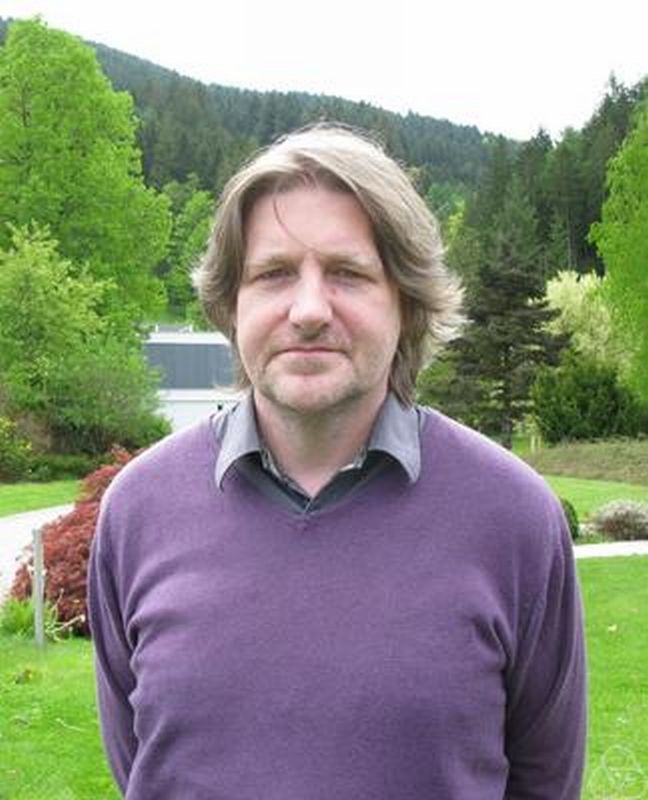
Michel Van den Bergh at Oberwolfach in 2010

Michel Van den Bergh (born 25 July 1960) is a Belgian mathematician and professor at the Vrije Universiteit Brussel and does research at Hasselt University. His research interest is on the fundamental relationship between algebra and geometry. In 2003, he was awarded the Francqui Prize on Exact Sciences.

Van den Bergh obtained his Ph.D. in mathematics from the University of Antwerp in 1985, with thesis Algebraic Elements in Finite Dimensional Division Algebras written under the direction of Fred Van Oystaeyen and Jan Maria Hendrik Van Geel.
