= Implicate and explicate order =

Ontological concepts for quantum theory

Implicate order and explicate order are ontological concepts for quantum theory coined by theoretical physicist David Bohm during the early 1980s. They are used to describe two different frameworks for understanding the same phenomenon or aspect of reality. In particular, the concepts were developed in order to explain the bizarre behaviors of subatomic particles which quantum physics describes and predicts with elegant precision but struggles to explain.

In Bohm's Wholeness and the Implicate Order, he used these notions to describe how the appearance of such phenomena might appear differently, or might be characterized by, varying principal factors, depending on contexts such as scales. The implicate (also referred to as the "enfolded") order is seen as a deeper and more fundamental order of reality. In contrast, the explicate or "unfolded" order includes the abstractions that humans normally perceive. As he wrote:

In the enfolded [or implicate] order, space and time are no longer the dominant factors determining the relationships of dependence or independence of different elements. Rather, an entirely different sort of basic connection of elements is possible, from which our ordinary notions of space and time, along with those of separately existent material particles, are abstracted as forms derived from the deeper order. These ordinary notions in fact appear in what is called the "explicate" or "unfolded" order, which is a special and distinguished form contained within the general totality of all the implicate orders (Bohm 1980, p. xv).

== Overview ==
The notion of implicate and explicate orders emphasizes the primacy of structure and process over individual objects. The latter are seen as mere approximations of an underlying process. In this approach, quantum particles and other objects are understood to have only a limited degree of stability and autonomy.

Bohm believed that the weirdness of the behavior of quantum particles is caused by unobserved forces, maintaining that space and time might actually be derived from an even deeper level of objective reality. In the words of F. David Peat, Bohm considered that what we take for reality are "surface phenomena, explicate forms that have temporarily unfolded out of an underlying implicate order." That is, the implicate order is the ground from which reality emerges.

=== The implicate order as an algebra ===
Bohm, his colleague Basil Hiley, and other physicists of Birkbeck College worked toward a model of quantum physics in which the implicate order is represented in the form of an appropriate algebra or other pregeometry. They considered spacetime itself as part of an explicate order that is connected to an implicate order that they called pre-space. The spacetime manifold and the properties of locality and nonlocality all arise from an order in such pre-space. A. M. Frescura and Hiley suggested that an implicate order could be carried by an algebra, with the explicate order being contained in the various representations of this algebra.

In analogy to Alfred North Whitehead's notion of "actual occasion," Bohm considered the notion of moment – a moment being a not entirely localizable event, with events being allowed to overlap and being connected in an overall implicate order:

I propose that each moment of time is a projection from the total implicate order. The term projection is a particularly happy choice here, not only because its common meaning is suitable for what is needed, but also because its mathematical meaning as a projection operation, P, is just what is required for working out these notions in terms of the quantum theory.

Bohm emphasized the primary role of the implicate order's structure:

My attitude is that the mathematics of the quantum theory deals primarily with the structure of the implicate pre-space and with how an explicate order of space and time emerges from it, rather than with movements of physical entities, such as particles and fields. (This is a kind of extension of what is done in general relativity, which deals primarily with geometry and only secondarily with the entities that are described within this geometry.)

=== The explicate order and quantum entanglement ===
Central to Bohm's schema are correlations between observables of entities which seem separated by great distances in the explicate order (such as a particular electron here on Earth and an alpha particle in one of the stars in the Abell 1835 galaxy, then a possible candidate for farthest galaxy from Earth known to humans), manifestations of the implicate order. Within quantum theory, there is entanglement of such objects.

This view of order necessarily departs from any notion which entails signalling, and therefore causality. The correlation of observables does not imply a causal influence, and in Bohm's schema, the latter represents 'relatively' independent events in spacetime; and therefore explicate order.

=== A common grounding for consciousness and matter ===
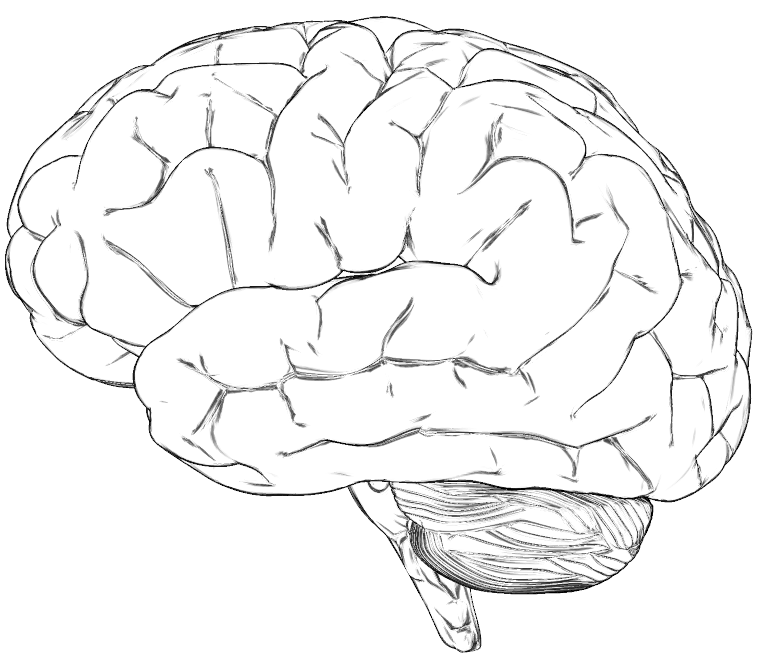
Karl H. Pribram's research suggests that memories may not be localized in specific regions of brains

The implicate order represents the proposal of a general metaphysical concept in terms of which it is claimed that matter and consciousness might both be understood, in the sense that it is proposed that both matter and consciousness: (i) enfold the structure of the whole within each region, and (ii) involve continuous processes of enfoldment and unfoldment. For example, in the case of matter, entities such as atoms may represent continuous enfoldment and unfoldment which manifests as a relatively stable and autonomous entity that can be observed to follow a relatively well-defined path in spacetime. In the case of consciousness, Bohm pointed toward evidence presented by Karl Pribram that memories may be enfolded within every region of the brain rather than being localized (for example, in particular regions of the brain, cells, or atoms).

Bohm went on to say:

As in our discussion of matter in general, it is now necessary to go into the question of how in consciousness the explicate order is what is manifest ... the manifest content of consciousness is based essentially on memory, which is what allows such content to be held in a fairly constant form. Of course, to make possible such constancy it is also necessary that this content be organized, not only through relatively fixed association but also with the aid of the rules of logic, and of our basic categories of space, time, causality, universality, etc. ... there will be a strong background of recurrent, stable, and separable features, against which the transitory and changing aspects of the unbroken flow of experience will be seen as fleeting impressions that tend to be arranged and ordered mainly in terms of the vast totality of the relatively static and fragmented content of [memories].

Bohm also claimed that "as with consciousness, each moment has a certain explicate order, and in addition it enfolds all the others, though in its own way. So the relationship of each moment in the whole to all the others is implied by its total content: the way in which it 'holds' all the others enfolded within it." Bohm characterises consciousness as a process in which at each moment, content that was previously implicate is presently explicate, and content which was previously explicate has become implicate.

One may indeed say that our memory is a special case of the process described above, for all that is recorded is held enfolded within the brain cells and these are part of matter in general. The recurrence and stability of our own memory as a relatively independent sub-totality is thus brought about as part of the very same process that sustains the recurrence and stability in the manifest order of matter in general. It follows, then, that the explicate and manifest order of consciousness is not ultimately distinct from that of matter in general.

== Analogies ==
=== Ink droplet analogy ===
Bohm also used the term unfoldment to characterise processes in which the explicate order becomes relevant (or "relevated"). Bohm likens unfoldment also to the decoding of a television signal to produce a sensible image on a screen. The signal, screen, and television electronics in this analogy represent the implicate order, while the image produced represents the explicate order. He also uses an example in which an ink droplet can be introduced into a highly viscous substance (such as glycerine), and the substance rotated very slowly, such that there is negligible diffusion of the substance. In this example, the droplet becomes a thread, which in turn eventually becomes invisible. However, by rotating the substance in the reverse direction, the droplet can essentially reform. When it is invisible, according to Bohm, the order of the ink droplet as a pattern can be said to be implicate within the substance.

In another analogy, Bohm asks us to consider a pattern produced by making small cuts in a folded piece of paper and then, literally, unfolding it. Widely separated elements of the pattern are, in actuality, produced by the same original cut in the folded piece of paper. Here, the cuts in the folded paper represent the implicate order, and the unfolded pattern represents the explicate order.

=== Holograms and implicate order ===
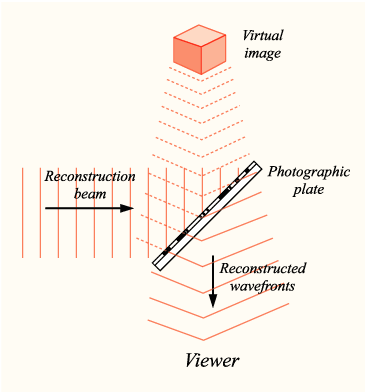
In a holographic reconstruction, each region of a photographic plate contains the whole image

Bohm employed the hologram as a means of characterising implicate order, noting that each region of a photographic plate in which a hologram is observable contains within it the whole three-dimensional image, which can be viewed from a range of perspectives. That is, each region contains a whole and undivided image. In Bohm's words:

There is the germ of a new notion of order here. This order is not to be understood solely in terms of a regular arrangement of objects (e.g., in rows) or as a regular arrangement of events (e.g., in a series). Rather, a total order is contained, in some implicit sense, in each region of space and time. Now, the word 'implicit' is based on the verb 'to implicate'. This means 'to fold inward' ... so we may be led to explore the notion that in some sense each region contains a total structure 'enfolded' within it".

Bohm noted that, although the hologram conveys undivided wholeness, it is nevertheless static.

In this view of order, laws represent invariant relationships between explicate entities and structures, and thus Bohm maintained that, in physics, the explicate order generally reveals itself within well-constructed experimental contexts as, for example, in the sensibly observable results of instruments. With respect to implicate order, however, Bohm asked us to consider the possibility instead "that physical law should refer primarily to an order of undivided wholeness of the content of description similar to that indicated by the hologram rather than to an order of analysis of such content into separate parts...".

=== Implicate order in art ===
In the work Science, Order, and Creativity (Bohm and Peat, 1987), examples of implicate orders in science are laid out, as well as implicate orders which relate to painting, poetry and music.

Bohm and Peat emphasize the role of orders of varying complexity, which influence the perception of a work of art as a whole. They note that implicate orders are accessible to human experience. They refer, for instance, to earlier notes which reverberate when listening to music, or various resonances of words and images which are perceived when reading or hearing poetry.

Christopher Alexander discussed his work in person with Bohm, and pointed out connections among his work and Bohm's notion of an implicate order in The Nature of Order.

Bohm features as a fictional character in the novel The Wave by British author Lochlan Bloom. The novel includes multiple narratives and explores many of the concepts of Bohm's work on implicate and explicate orders.

== Challenges to some generally prevailing views ==
In proposing this new notion of order, Bohm explicitly challenged a number of tenets that he believed are fundamental to much scientific work:

1. that phenomena are reducible to fundamental particles and laws describing the behaviour of particles, or more generally to any static (i.e., unchanging) entities, whether separate events in spacetime, quantum states, or static entities of some other nature;
2. related to (1), that human knowledge is most fundamentally concerned with mathematical prediction of statistical aggregates of particles;
3. that an analysis or description of any aspect of reality (e.g., quantum theory, the speed of light) can be unlimited in its domain of relevance;
4. that the Cartesian coordinate system, or its extension to a curvilinear system, is the deepest conception of underlying order as a basis for analysis and description of the world;
5. that there is ultimately a sustainable distinction between reality and thought, and that there is a corresponding distinction between the observer and observed in an experiment or any other situation (other than a distinction between relatively separate entities valid in the sense of explicate order); and
6. that it is, in principle, possible to formulate a final notion concerning the nature of reality, i.e., a Theory of Everything.

A hydrogen atom and its constituent particles: an example of an over-simplified way of looking at a small collection of posited building blocks of the universe

Bohm's proposals have at times been dismissed largely on the basis of such tenets. His paradigm is generally opposed to reductionism, and some view it as a form of ontological holism. On this, Bohm noted of prevailing views among physicists that "the world is assumed to be constituted of a set of separately existent, indivisible, and unchangeable 'elementary particles', which are the fundamental 'building blocks' of the entire universe ... there seems to be an unshakable faith among physicists that either such particles, or some other kind yet to be discovered, will eventually make possible a complete and coherent explanation of everything" (Bohm 1980, p. 173).

In Bohm's conception of order, primacy is given to the undivided whole, and the implicate order inherent within the whole, rather than to parts of the whole, such as particles, quantum states, and continua. This whole encompasses all things, structures, abstractions, and processes, including processes that result in (relatively) stable structures as well as those that involve a metamorphosis of structures or things. In this view, parts may be entities normally regarded as physical, such as atoms or subatomic particles, but they may also be abstract entities, such as quantum states. Whatever their nature and character, according to Bohm, these parts are considered in terms of the whole, and in such terms, they constitute relatively separate and independent "sub-totalities." The implication of the view is, therefore, that nothing is fundamentally separate or independent.

Bohm 1980, p. 11, said: "The new form of insight can perhaps best be called Undivided Wholeness in Flowing Movement. This view implies that flow is in some sense prior to that of the ‘things’ that can be seen to form and dissolve in this flow." According to Bohm, a vivid image of this sense of analysis of the whole is afforded by vortex structures in a flowing stream. Such vortices can be relatively stable patterns within a continuous flow, but such an analysis does not imply that the flow patterns have any sharp division, or that they are literally separate and independently existent entities; rather, they are most fundamentally undivided. Thus, according to Bohm’s view, the whole is in continuous flux, and hence is referred to as the holomovement (movement of the whole).

=== Quantum theory and relativity theory ===
A key motivation for Bohm in proposing a new notion of order was the well-known incompatibility of quantum theory with relativity theory. Bohm 1980, p. xv summarised the state of affairs he perceived to exist:

...in relativity, movement is continuous, causally determinate and well defined, while in quantum mechanics it is discontinuous, not causally determinate and not well-defined. Each theory is committed to its own notions of essentially static and fragmentary modes of existence (relativity to that of separate events connectible by signals, and quantum mechanics to a well-defined quantum state). One thus sees that a new kind of theory is needed which drops these basic commitments and at most recovers some essential features of the older theories as abstract forms derived from a deeper reality in which what prevails is unbroken wholeness.

Bohm maintained that relativity and quantum theories are in basic contradiction in these essential respects, and that a new concept of order should begin with that toward which both theories point: undivided wholeness. This should not be taken to mean that he advocated such powerful theories be discarded. He argued that each was relevant in a certain context—i.e., a set of interrelated conditions within the explicate order—rather than having unlimited scope, and that apparent contradictions stem from attempts to overgeneralize by superposing the theories on one another, implying greater generality or broader relevance than is ultimately warranted. Thus, Bohm 1980, pp. 156–167 argued: "... in sufficiently broad contexts such analytic descriptions cease to be adequate ... 'the law of the whole' will generally include the possibility of describing the 'loosening' of aspects from each other, so that they will be relatively autonomous in limited contexts ... however, any form of relative autonomy (and heteronomy) is ultimately limited by holonomy, so that in a broad enough context such forms are seen to be merely aspects, relevated in the holomovement, rather than disjoint and separately existent things in interaction."

=== Hidden variable theory ===
Before developing his implicit order approach, Bohm had proposed a hidden variable theory of quantum physics (see Bohm interpretation). According to Bohm, a key motivation for doing so had been purely to show the possibility of such theories. On this, Bohm 1980, p. 81 said, "... it should be kept in mind that before this proposal was made there had existed the widespread impression that no conception of any hidden variable at all, not even if it were abstract and hypothetical, could possibly be consistent with the quantum theory." Bohm 1980, p. 110 also claimed that "the demonstration of the possibility of theories of hidden variables may serve in a more general philosophical sense to remind us of the unreliability of conclusions based on the assumption of the complete universality of certain features of a given theory, however general their domain of validity seems to be." Another aspect of Bohm's motivation had been to point out a confusion he perceived to exist in quantum theory. On the dominant approaches in quantum theory, he said: "...we wish merely to point out that this whole line of approach re-establishes at the abstract level of statistical potentialities the same kind of analysis into separate and autonomous components in interaction that is denied at the more concrete level of individual objects" (Bohm 1980, p. 174).

== See also ==
- Direct realism
- Herbertsmithite
- Holographic principle
- Implicature
- Indra's net
- Interpretations of quantum mechanics
- Mereology
- Monadology
- Neutral monism
- Noumenon
- Quantum entanglement
- Quantum mind
- Representative realism
- String-net
- Topological order
- Transcendental idealism
