= In Search of Nikola Tesla =

In Search of Nikola Tesla is a book by David Peat published in 1983.

== Contents ==
In Search of Nikola Tesla is a book focusing on the research of Nikola Tesla.

== Reception ==
Dave Langford reviewed In Search of Nikola Tesla for White Dwarf #50, and stated that "Sifting through the maze of Tesla's later loony patents and the modern cultists who overvalue them, Peat charts a fascinating voyage through the self-deceptions and genuine achievements of the great man and others. I could have used less information about Peat [...] and more about Tesla, but it's a genuinely-interesting read."
