= Nicholas A. M. Monk =

Physicist and mathematician

- Education: University of Cambridge (BA); Birkbeck College, University of London (PhD)
- Scientific career
- Fields: Mathematics; Mathematical biology
- Workplaces: University of Sheffield, University of Ghana
- Thesis: Algebraic Structures in the Light of the Implicate Order (1994)
- Doctoral advisor: Basil Hiley
- Website: https://sites.google.com/aims.edu.gh/nick-monk/home

Nicholas A. M. Monk is a physicist and mathematician. He is Alexander von Humboldt Foundation German Research Chair at AIMS Ghana and Professor of Mathematical Biology at the University of Sheffield and the University of Ghana. He is known for his works on mathematical biology, pattern formation, and dynamical systems. He earned his PhD in 1994 from Birkbeck College, University of London. His advisor was Basil Hiley.
