= Electronic Journal of Theoretical Physics =

- Discipline: Theoretical physics
- Language: English
- Edited by: Ammar Sakaji, Ignazio Licata

Publication details
- History: 2003–present
- Publisher: Aracne Editrice (Italy)
- Frequency: Quarterly
- Open access: Yes

Standard abbreviations
- ISO 4: Electron. J. Theor. Phys.

Indexing
- CODEN: EJTPBC
- ISSN: 1729-5254
- OCLC no.: 488571488

The Electronic Journal of Theoretical Physics is a quarterly peer-reviewed open access scientific journal that was established in 2003. It covers all aspects of theoretical physics. The editors-in-chief are Ammar Sakaji (International Institute for Theoretical Physics and Mathematics, Prato, Italy) and Ignazio Licata (Institute for Scientific Methodology, Palermo, Italy) and the printed version is published by Aracne Editrice. The journal is abstracted and indexed in Scopus.

== Majorana Prize ==
Majorana Medal

The journal annually awards the Majorana Prize, also known as the Majorana Medal, to recognize outstanding contributions to theoretical and mathematical physics. The prize is named for Italian physicist Ettore Majorana (1906–1938), a pioneer in neutrino physics and the quantum mechanics of spin. It is awarded in three categories:

- The Best Person in Physics
- The Best EJTP Special Issue Paper
- The Best EJTP Paper

=== Best Person in Physics recipients ===
| Year | Recipient | Institution |
|---|---|---|
| 2006 | Erasmo Recami | University of Bergamo |
| 2006 | E. C. George Sudarshan | University of Texas at Austin |
| 2007 | Lee Smolin | Perimeter Institute for Theoretical Physics |
| 2008 | Geoffrey Chew | Lawrence Berkeley National Laboratory |
| 2009 | Mario Rasetti | Polytechnic University of Turin |
| 2010 | N. David Mermin | Cornell University |
| 2012 | Basil Hiley | University of London |
