= John Briggs (author) =

American academic

John Briggs (born 1945) is an American author and co-author of general audience nonfiction books in the fields of holistic physics; aesthetics in the arts; creativity, creative process, and consciousness studies. Emeritus Distinguished CSU Professor of Writing and Aesthetics at Western Connecticut State University, Briggs lives in Granville, Massachusetts, where he has served as a Selectman and a police officer.
