= Ignazio Licata =

Italian theoretical physicist and professor (born 1958)

Ignazio Licata (born 1958) is an Italian theoretical physicist, professor and scientific director of the Institute for Scientific Methodology, Italy.

== Education and career ==
Licata has studied with David Bohm, Jean-Pierre Vigier, Abdus Salam and Giuseppe Arcidiacono.

Licata is editor-in-chief of the Electronic Journal of Theoretical Physics (EJTP) and scientific director of the interdisciplinary Institute for Scientific Methodology (ISEM), located in Bagheria, Province of Palermo, Italy.

He has worked on quantum field theory, interpretation of quantum mechanics, and recently quantum cosmology. His further topics of research include the foundation of quantum mechanics, space-time at Planck scale, the group approach in quantum cosmology, systems theory, non-linear dynamics, as well as computation in physical, biological and cognitive systems (logical openness, sub and super Turing systems). Licata has developed a new approach to quantum cosmology ("Archaic Universe") based on de Sitter invariant special relativity.

== Awards ==
- "Le Veneri per la Scienza" prize (Lecce, 2008) for "the high merit in research and cultural diffusion"
- "Targa Pirandello" (Agrigento, 2010)
- "International Prize Conference on Time" (Al Ain, 2012)

== Publications ==
=== Books (as author) ===
- Ignazio Licata, Davide Fiscaletti: Quantum potential: Physics, Geometry and Algebra, AMC, Springer, 2013, ISBN 978-3-319-00332-0 (print) / ISBN 978-3-319-00333-7 (online)
- Ignazio Licata: Complessità. Un'introduzione semplice, :Duepunti, 2011, ISBN 978-8889987674
- Ignazio Licata: La Logica Aperta della Mente, Codice Edizioni, Torino, 2008, ISBN 978-8875780906
- Ignazio Licata: Osservando la Sfinge. La realtà virtuale della fisica quantistica, Di Renzo, Roma, 2003, ISBN 978-8883230639

=== Books (other) ===
- Ignazio Licata, Ammar Sakaji (eds.): Vision of Oneness, Aracne (2011), ISBN 978-88-548-44629
- Ignazio Licata, Sara Felloni, Ammar J. Sakaji, Jatinder Singh (eds.): New Trends in Quantum Information, Aracne, 2010, ISBN 978-8854834118
- Ignazio Licata, Ammar Sakaji (eds.): Crossing in Complexity: Interdisciplinary Application of Physics in Biological and Social Systems, Nova Science Publishers, 2010, ISBN 9781616680374
- Ammar Sakaji, Ignazio Licata (eds.): Lev Davidovich Landau and His Impact on Contemporary Theoretical Physics (Horizons in World Physics), Nova Science Publishers, 2009, ISBN 978-1606929087
- Unexpected Connections: Art–Science Crossing, Politi Publ., Milan, 2009
- Ignazio Licata, Ammar Sakaji (eds.): Physics of Emergence and Organization, EJTP and World Scientific, 2008, ISBN 978-9812779946
- Ignazio Licata: Majorana Legacy in Contemporary Physics, EJTP and Di Renzo, Roma 2006, ISBN 9788883231520
- Informazione & Complessità, Edizioni Andromeda, Bologna, 1998

=== Articles (selection) ===
- Articles by Ignazio Licata at arXiv.org and at PhilPapers
- Ignazio Licata: Vision as Adaptive Epistemology, in G. Minati Ed., Methods, models, simulations and approaches. Towards a general theory of change, World Scientific, 2012
- Ignazio Licata, Gianfranco Minati: "Meta-structural properties in collective behaviours", International Journal of General Systems, vol. 41, nr. 3, pp. 289–311 (2012)
- Ignazio Licata, Leonardo Chiatti: "Archaic universe and cosmological model: "big-bang" as nucleation by vacuum", International Journal of Theoretical Physics, vol. 49, nr. 10, pp. 2379–2402 (2010), DOI: 10.1007/s10773-010-0424-0 (abstract)
- Ignazio Licata: Almost-anywhere theories: reductionism and universality of emergence, Complexity, vol. 15, n. 6, pp. 11–19 (2010)
- Ignazio Licata, Leonardo Chiatti: The archaic universe: big bang, cosmological term and the quantum origin of time in projective cosmology, International Journal of Theoretical Physics, vol. 48, nr. 4 (2009), pp. 1003–1018, DOI: 10.1007/s10773-008-9874-z (abstract)
- Ignazio Licata: A dynamical model for information retrieval and emergence of scale-free clusters in a long term memory network, in Complexity: Emergence and Organization (E:CO), vol. 11, nr. 1, 2009, pp. 48-57, arXiv:0801.0887 (submitted 6 January 2008)
- Ignazio Licata: Logical openness in cognitive models, Epistemologia XXXVI (2008), pp. 177–192 (full text)
- Ignazio Licata, Luigi Lella: A new model for the organizational knowledge life cycle in G. Minati, E. Pessa (eds.): Processes of emergence of systems and systemic properties. Towards a general theory of emergence, World Scientific, 2008
- Ignazio Licata, Luigi Lella: Evolutionary neural gas (ENG): A model of self-organising network from input categorization (2007) EJTP, vol. 4, nr. 14
- Ignazio Licata: Universe without singularities. A group approach to de Sitter cosmology, EJTP, vol. 3 nr. 10 (2006), pp. 211-224
