= F. David Peat =

Physicist and author (1938–2017)

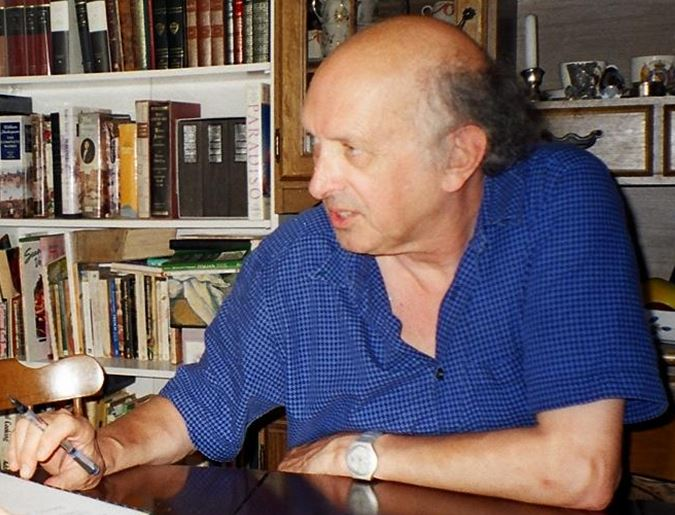
- Born: Francis David Peat; April 18, 1938; Waterloo, Merseyside, England
- Died: June 6, 2017 (aged 79); Pari, Tuscany, Italy
- Education: University of Liverpool
- Scientific career
- Fields: Condensed matter Philosophy of science
- Workplaces: California Institute of Integral Studies; National Research Council of Canada; Pari Center for New Learning

Francis David Peat (18 April 1938 –6 June 2017) was a British holistic physicist and author who has carried out research in solid state physics and the foundation of quantum theory.

He was director of the Pari Center for New Learning, which is located in the village of Pari near Grosseto in Tuscany, Italy. He was adjunct professor at the California Institute of Integral Studies and Schumacher College, a Fellow of the World Academy of Art and Science and a Distinguished Fellow at the University of South Africa.

== Biography ==
Peat was born in Waterloo, England in 1938.

Peat did his undergraduate studies at the University of Liverpool. There he received a PhD in physics in 1964. In 1965, he became assistant professor at Queen's University in Kingston, Ontario. Subsequently, from 1967 to 1975, he worked as research scientist for the National Research Council of Canada. During this time, from 1971 to 1972, he performed a sabbatical study with David Bohm and Roger Penrose at Birkbeck College in London.

For many years he was associated with physicist and philosopher David Bohm; the two wrote the book Science, Order, and Creativity together, and Peat later wrote Bohm's biography, Infinite Potential: The Life and Times of David Bohm. In the context of this biography, Peat emphasized how Bohm had worked intensely on finding a mathematical expression for his vision of an interconnected, enfolded implicate order, from which an explicate order, the world of classical physics unfolds. Bohm also aimed at re-introducing time as a dynamic entity. According to Peat, the use of the term Bohmian mechanics for his theory "would have shocked Dave [Bohm] somewhat": what was happening with the ideas of Bohm's and Basil Hiley's theory, similarly as what had occurred with those of Hermann Grassmann, William Rowan Hamilton and William Kingdon Clifford before, was that physicists left the fundamental ideas aside and merely made use of them as an easy manner of performing calculations.

While living in Canada, Peat organized discussion circles between Western scientists and Native American elders, together with Leroy Little Bear who later obtained the 2003 National Aboriginal Achievement Award, now the Indspire Awards, for Education. While living in London, Peat organized a conference between artists and scientists. In 1996 he moved from Canada to Pari, Italy.

In 2000, he founded the Pari Center for New Learning, a center dedicated to education, learning and research, together with writer and researcher Maureen Doolan. The activities of the Pari Center comprise residential courses and conferences and possibilities for scholars and researchers to spend extended periods as residents in Pari.

Peat wrote on the subjects of science, art, and spirituality and proposed the notions of creative suspension and gentle action. He authored or co-authored many books including Synchronicity: The Bridge between Matter and Mind, Seven Life Lessons of Chaos, Turbulent Mirror, Gentle Action, and Pathways of Chance. His most recent book was A Flickering Reality: Cinema and the Nature of Reality.

Peat died in 2017 at Pari, Civitella Paganico, Italy.

== Gentle action ==
A focus of Peat's recent work was the concept of gentle action. This approach, as envisaged by Peat, emphasizes a certain manner of action that is aimed at creating change in an effective manner. The approach calls for tolerating uncertainty yet suspending action at its onset in order to allow an overall view to emerge. It emphasizes the value of small-scale, iterative actions compared to large, single-step interventions. In his book of the same name, published 2008, Peat points out connections of his approach to earlier concepts, emphasizing the importance of active listening and a similarity to the concept of wu wei.

Peat's gentle action has been cited together with Otto Scharmer's Theory U and Arnold Mindell's worldwork as approaches by which individuals, groups, organisations and communities can deal with complex issues.

Learning modules based on Peat's gentle action approach have been put in place, among others, at the University of Minnesota and at Siena Heights University.

== Books ==
- Synchronicity: The marriage of matter and psyche, 2015, Pari Publishing ISBN 8895604261
- A Flickering Reality: Cinema and the Nature of Reality, 2011, Pari Publishing ISBN 978-88-95604-09-1
- Synchronicity: Multiple perspectives on meaningful Coincidence (with Lance Storm et al.) 2008, Pari Publishing ISBN 8895604024
- Gentle Action: Bringing creative change to a turbulent world, 2008, Pari Publishing ISBN 978-88-95604-03-9
- Pathways of Chance, 2005, Pari Publishing, ISBN 0-9768264-0-2
- I sentieri del caso, 2004, Di Renzo Editore, ISBN 88-8323-079-5
- From Certainty to Uncertainty: The Story of Science and Ideas in the Twentieth Century, 2002, Joseph Henry Press, ISBN 0-309-07641-2
- The Blackwinged Night: Creativity in Nature and Mind, 2001, Basic Books, ISBN 0-7382-0491-9
- Seven Life Lessons of Chaos: Spiritual Wisdom from the Science of Change, 1999, with John Briggs, HarperCollins, 2000 Harper Perennial paperback: ISBN 0-06-093073-X
- In Search of Nikola Tesla, 1997, Ashgrove Publishing, 2002 edition: ISBN 1-85398-117-6
- Infinite Potential: The Life and Times of David Bohm, 1997, Perseus Books, ISBN 0-201-40635-7
- Glimpsing Reality: Ideas in Physics and the Link to Biology, 1996, with Paul Buckley, University of Toronto Press, ISBN 0-8020-6994-0
- Blackfoot Physics: A Journey into the Native American Worldview,1995/2002, Phanes Press, ISBN 1-890482-83-8
- Lighting the Seventh Fire: The Spiritual Ways, Healing, and Science of the Native American, 1994, Carol Publishing, ISBN 1-55972-249-5
- The Philosopher's Stone: Chaos, Synchronicity, and the Hidden Order of the World, 1991, ISBN 0-553-35329-2
- Einstein's Moon: Bell's Theorem and the Curious Quest for Quantum Reality, 1990, Contemporary Books, ISBN 0-8092-4512-4
- Turbulent Mirror: An Illustrated Guide to Chaos Theory and the Science of Wholeness, 1989, with John Briggs, Harper & Row, 1990 Harper Perennial paperback ISBN 0-06-091696-6
- Superstrings and the Search for the Theory of Everything, 1989, McGraw-Hill, ISBN 0-8092-4257-5
- Cold Fusion: The Making of a Scientific Controversy, 1989, Contemporary Books, ISBN 0-8092-4243-5
- Quantum Implications: Essays in Honour of David Bohm, by F. David Peat (Editor) and Basil Hiley (Editor), Routledge & Kegan Paul Ltd, London & New York, 1987
- Science, Order and Creativity, 1987 with David Bohm, Routledge, 2nd ed. 2000: ISBN 0-415-17182-2
- Synchronicity: The Bridge Between Matter and Mind, 1987, Bantam, ISBN 0-553-34676-8
- Looking Glass Universe: The Emerging Science of Wholeness, 1986, with John Briggs, Simon & Schuster, ISBN 0-671-63215-9

== See also ==
- Holism in science
