= Lochlan Bloom =

British novelist, screenwriter and short story writer

- Occupations: Novelist, screenwriter, short-story writer
- Writing career
- Genres: Fiction, literary fiction, mystery fiction, science fiction
- Website: www.lochlanbloom.com

Lochlan Bloom is a British novelist, screenwriter and short story writer. His writing is frequently focused on philosophical topics and features metafiction and unreliable narration.

He is the author of the novel The Wave, published by Dead Ink Books.

== Writing career ==
Bloom studied physics and many of his works feature philosophical concerns with reality and scientific theories. He has written for various magazines and online journals.

The Wave was selected by Dead Ink Books as part of the New Voices series and was part-funded by the Arts Council England.

== Works ==
- The Wave (London: Dead Ink Books, 2016), ISBN 0-9576985-6-9
- The Open Cage (Melbourne: InShort Publishing, 2015) ISBN 9780994375452
- Ambi & Anspi and other stories (London: Philistine Press, 2015),
- Trade (London: CreateSpace, 2013), ISBN 978-1484186398
