= Science, Order, and Creativity =

1987 book by David Bohm and F. David Peat

- Author: David Bohm, F. David Peat
- Language: English
- Subject: Science, Creativity
- Publisher: Bantam Books / Routledge
- Publication date: 1987 / 1989
- Publication place: United States / United Kingdom
- ISBN: 978-0-553-34449-3

Science, Order, and Creativity is a book by theoretical physicist David Bohm and physicist and writer F. David Peat. It was originally published 1987 by Bantam Books, US, then 1989 in Great Britain by Routledge. The second edition, published in 2000 after Bohm's death, comprises a new foreword by Peat as well as an additional introductory chapter, in which a fictitious dialogue between Bohm and Peat serves to introduce the reader to the context and topics of the book.

In Science, Order and Creativity, the authors emphasize the role of creativity and communication for science and, also beyond science, for humanity as a whole.

== Contents by chapter ==
1 Revolutions, Theories, and Creativity in Science
The authors consider the form of creativity that is constituted by a metaphor and by equating two different kinds of things, based on an act of perception of a similarity. They emphasize the role of communication and art as part of creativity, citing the example of Helen Keller who, through communication with her mentor Anne Sullivan was led to understanding a similarity among the sensations of water and the symbolic gesture pressed into her palm which represented it.

2 Science as Creative Perception–Communication
The authors build upon the aspect of communication by discussing science as a social activity and the role of language in science, discussing in particular also the examples of the various interpretations of quantum mechanics, including the objections raised against the causal interpretation of quantum mechanics. They point out that its mathematical basis is open to a range of modifications which extend "beyond current quantum theory", for instance concerning the role of trajectories.

3 What is Order?
The notion is introduced that all processes take place in an order, with the particular order depending on context. They distinguish orders of first, second and higher degrees, and interpret randomness as an order of infinite degree. At the same time, the degree itself depends on the context, and on what is known and taken into consideration concerning the underlying processes. Bohm and Peat further propose to a spectrum of order, with causal laws and statistical laws representing limiting cases of a more general range of possibilities.

4 The Generate Order and the Implicate Order
This chapter introduces the notions of generative order and implicate order, citing examples from, among others, mathematics (fractal order as proposed by Benoit Mandelbrot, Fourier series, and touching upon Goethe's notion of an Urpflanze and the morphology of plants) art (from schemata changing from Renaissance painting to the vortex-like order of J. M. W. Turner to the use of light by Claude Monet and the exploration of composition and structure by Paul Cézanne), science (holography, the Green's function and its relation to Feynman diagrams and the Huygens principle, as well as Bohm's implicit order, superimplicate order and holomovement in an infinite extension). The implicate and generative orders are emphasized as ground for all experience, accessible to direct experience by perception of well-defined forms, for instance the reverberation of earlier notes of music, or the viewing of a scene of a film as a whole, or various resonances of words and images in poetry. Explicate orders, in contrast, are emphasized by society in so far as they are considered absolutely necessary for its survival, and suitable for large-scale organization and technology.

5 Generative Order in Science, Society, and Consciousness
These considerations are carried further, citing among others the works of Conrad Hal Waddington, Stephen Jay Gould, Brian Goodwin and Rupert Sheldrake towards a generative order that lies beyond both Lamarckism and Darwinism. This chapter further provides a view of the role of human creativity, when attention is allowed to move freely, for putting forth "new sensory orders and structures that form into new perceptions".

6 Creativity in the Whole of Life
The individual, cosmic and social dimensions are considered. It is held that creativity blockages can be overcome and that "'loosening' rigidly held intellectual content in the tacit infrastructure of consciousness" plays a main role for awakening creative intelligence.

7 The Order Between and Beyond
Examples of the development of various orders are provided. To solve problems faced by society, there is need to find not merely "orders in between" (as a form of compromise between other orders) but rather to creatively extend to richer "orders beyond" which encompass different orders together in another form. As one of the examples for a search for "an order beyond", the authors cite the work of Bohm and his colleague Basil Hiley towards finding an underlying pre-space which would allow the incompatibilities of quantum theory and relativity to be addressed. The authors emphasize that creativity, including the search for "orders beyond", contributes to make it possible to "move towards a new consciousness".

== Reception ==
The book has been cited in the fields of education and science education, and knowledge management, among many others. Referencing this book, in the framework of his concept of a Total human ecosystem, Zev Naveh has also referred to implicate orders as "very important" for multifunctional landscapes in landscape ecology.
