= Holomovement =

Concept in metaphysics

Holomovement is a theoretical concept proposed by physicist David Bohm to describe a dynamic and unbroken totality that underlies all of reality. It forms the foundation of Bohm's interpretation of quantum mechanics and his metaphysical model, particularly as articulated in his book Wholeness and the Implicate Order (1980). The holomovement integrates two key ideas: undivided wholeness and constant process. It suggests that everything in the universe is interconnected and in continual motion, with all forms and structures being temporary abstractions from this deeper, flowing unity. Critics have described holomovement as a type of metaphysical mysticism.

== Origins and background ==
Louis de Broglie introduced a formalism for quantum mechanics at the 1927 Solvay Congress which explained quantum effects in terms of underlying processes such as a hypothesized pilot wave. This was met with strong criticism, particularly by Wolfgang Pauli, which caused de Broglie to abandon this suggestion. In 1952, Bohm revived the notion of a pilot wave guiding elementary particles in a way that withstood Pauli's criticism. Bohm and Basil Hiley criticized a solely epistemological model which only accounts for what can be known about physical processes; developing this pilot-wave theory into an ontological interpretation.

Bohm felt the extended version of this causal interpretation, particularly the notion of quantum potential, implied a "radically new notion of unbroken wholeness of the entire universe". In this wholeness, which he termed the holomovement, "all things found in the unfolded, explicate order emerge from the holomovement in which they are enfolded as potentialities and ultimately they fall back into it."

Bohm's dissatisfaction with mechanistic explanations in physics led him to propose a new worldview that emphasized interconnectedness and process. Influenced by his collaborations with Hiley and later F. David Peat, Bohm expanded his framework into a metaphysical model encompassing not only physical reality but also consciousness and cosmology.

== Core concepts ==
=== Definition ===
Bohm defines 'holomovement' as an "unknown and indescribable totality." He goes on to say:

"Thus in its totality, the holomovement is not limited in any specifiable way at all. It is not required to conform to any particular order, or to be bounded by any particular measure. Thus, the holomovement is undefinable and immeasurable."

— David Bohm

=== Undivided wholeness ===
In the first essay of Wholeness and the Implicate Order, Bohm introduces the idea of "undivided wholeness in flowing movement" as a paradigm shift from the fragmentary view of classical physics. He argues that all things are temporary abstractions from a continuous process of becoming, and that wholeness precedes the parts. Bohm's notion has been interpreted by scholars as a shift toward a process-based ontology grounded in quantum realism.

=== Implicate and explicate order ===
Bohm distinguishes between two orders of reality: the implicate (enfolded) order and the explicate (unfolded) order. The implicate order represents the hidden, generative structure of reality from which observable phenomena emerge. The holomovement is the ground from which the implicate and explicate orders arise, and into which they return.

=== All is flux ===
Echoing the philosophy of Heraclitus, Bohm emphasizes that all reality is process: "All is flux." He contrasts this with the mechanistic view of isolated particles and static laws, proposing instead that process and movement are the primary realities. Bohm's emphasis on flux and interrelation has been compared to classical Chinese thought, including the processual logic of the Yijing (Book of Changes), which models reality in terms of instability and transformation.

== Applications and implications ==
Bohm proposed, in a metaphysical extension of his quantum theory, that life and consciousness might emerge from the same implicate order that underlies physical processes. This view has been taken up in transpersonal psychology and speculative cosmology, but remains outside mainstream neuroscience.

Recent interpretations in integrative biology have extended the holomovement concept to propose models of "omni-local consciousness," suggesting that consciousness may be a fundamental and distributed property of the holofield.

The holomovement has also been invoked in spiritual and activist communities as a metaphor for collective awakening and planetary coherence, sometimes framing it as a foundation for a "new story" in sociocultural evolution.

== Reception and criticism ==
Theckedath, in his review of The Undivided Universe: An Ontological Interpretation of Quantum Theory by D. Bohm, B. J. Hiley, criticized their characterization of holomovement as having two "poles", one mental and one physical. According to Theckedath, the mental pole adds an element of mysticism to the holomovement concept and separates holomovement from objective matter, creating a "notion of motion without matter".

Paavo Pylkkänen and Gordon Globus, have explored its potential relevance to mind-matter interactions and holistic neuroscience. In the field of religious studies, Wouter Hanegraaff has classified the holomovement as a "scientific myth" characteristic of New Age metaphysics. Nonetheless, it has inspired dialogues in fields such as systems theory, consciousness studies, and transpersonal psychology.

The holomovement has also been cited in speculative ethical frameworks concerning posthuman and extraterrestrial intelligences, where it serves as a basis for modeling universal interconnectivity and moral coherence.

Theologian Kevin J. Sharpe has proposed that Bohm's holomovement provides a viable framework for a non-dualistic metaphysical theology that preserves transcendence while allowing for dynamic immanence. Kabbalist and science scholar Jeffrey Gordon has argued that Bohm's concept of holomovement resonates with kabbalistic notions of divine unfolding, reflecting broader efforts to align mystical cosmologies with emerging scientific paradigms. Bohm's focus on vibratory unfoldment has also been compared to tantric meditative models in which primordial sound and vibration structure the unfolding of reality.

== See also ==
- Orchestrated objective reduction
- Karl H. Pribram
