= Paavo Pylkkänen =

Finnish philosopher

Paavo Pylkkänen (born 1959) is a Finnish philosopher of mind. He is an Associate Professor of Philosophy at the University of Skövde and a university lecturer in theoretical philosophy at the University of Helsinki. He is known for his work on mind-body studies, building on David Bohm's interpretation of quantum mechanics, in particular Bohm's view of the cosmos as an enfolding and unfolding whole including mind and matter.

== Work ==
Pylkkänen's areas of specialization are the mind-body problem, the basis of cognitive science, philosophy of physics, the philosophy of David Bohm and the foundations of quantum theory.

Since 1996 he has been employed at the University of Skövde in Skövde, Sweden, where he initiated a consciousness studies program combining philosophy and cognitive neuroscience. He is currently a temporary university lecturer in theoretical philosophy at the Department of Philosophy, History, Culture and Art Studies, at University of Helsinki, where he has regularly worked since 2008.

Pylkkänen has worked and published together with theoretical physicist Basil Hiley, a close co-worker of David Bohm over three decades. Hiley and Pylkkänen together addressed the question of the relation between mind and matter by the hypothesis of an active information within the conceptual framework of the de Broglie–Bohm theory. Pylkkänen's work Mind, Matter and the Implicate Order (2007) builds upon David Bohm's ontological interpretation of quantum theory, in which quantum processes are understood as a holomovement in terms of implicate and explicate orders.

== Bibliography ==
Articles and book chapters

- Pylkkänen, P.: Fundamental Physics and the Mind – Is There a Connection? Quantum Interaction, Lecture Notes in Computer Science, Volume 8951, p. 3–11, 20 February 2015
- Pylkkänen, P.: David Bohm och den vetenskapliga andan, 2010, Beyond belief and knowledge: Thoughts from a dialogue. Liljenström, H. & Linderman, A. (eds.). Stockholm : Carlsson p. 127–142. (in Swedish)
- Pylkkänen, P. : Quantum philosophy is philosophy enough, 2010, How we became doctors of philosophy. Roinila, M. (ed.). Helsinki: Suomen Filosofinen Yhdistys ry. p. 151–157.
- Pylkkänen, P.: Implications of Bohmian quantum ontology for psychopathology, March 2010. In : NeuroQuantology. vol. 8, no. 1, p. 37–48.
- Pylkkänen, P.: Does dynamical modelling explain time consciousness?, 2007, Computation, Information, Cognition: The Nexus and the Liminal. Stuart, S. & Crnkovic, G. D. (eds.). Newcastle: Cambridge Scholars Press p. 218–229.
- Pylkkänen, P.: Escaping the prison of language, 2007, Communication - Action - Meaning: A Festschrift to Jens Allwood. E. A. (ed.). Department of Linguistics, Göteborg University
- Pylkkänen, P. & Hiley, B. J.: Can mind affect matter via active information?, In: Mind and Matter, vol.3, no.2, Imprint Academic, 2005, p. 7–26.

Books and edited works

- Dewdney, C., Pylkkänen, P., Atmanspacher, H. (eds.) Foundations of Physics Vol. 43(4) April 2013, Special issue: Hiley Festschrift. Springer.
- Pylkkänen, P.: Mind, Matter and the Implicate Order, 2007 Berlin Heidelberg New York: Springer-Verlag. 270 p. (The Frontiers Collection), ISBN 3-540-23891-3.
- Paavo Pylkkänen and Tere Vadén (eds.): Dimensions of conscious experience, Advances in Consciousness Research, Volume 37, John Benjamins B.V., 2001, ISBN 1-58811-125-3.
- David Bohm & Charles Biederman (Paavo Pylkkänen, ed.): Bohm-Biederman Correspondence: Creativity and science, Routledge, 1999, ISBN 0-415-16225-4.
- P. Pylkkänen, P. Pylkkö, A. Hautamäki (eds.): Brain, Mind and Physics, IOS Press, 1997, ISBN 90-5199-254-8.
- P. Pylkkänen: Mind, matter and active information: the relevance of David Bohm's interpretation of quantum theory to cognitive science, Yliopistopaino, 1992, ISBN 951-45-6190-2
- P. Pylkkänen (ed.): The Search for Meaning: The New Spirit in Science and Philosophy, Crucible, The Aquarian Press, 1989, ISBN 978-1-85274-061-0.
