= Fred Van Oystaeyen =

Fred Van Oystaeyen (born 1947), also Freddy van Oystaeyen, is a mathematician and emeritus professor of mathematics at the University of Antwerp. He has pioneered work on noncommutative geometry, in particular noncommutative algebraic geometry.

== Biography ==
In 1972, Fred Van Oystaeyen obtained his Ph.D. from the Vrije Universiteit of Amsterdam. In 1975 he became professor at the University of Antwerp, Department of Mathematics and Computer Science.

Van Oystaeyen has well over 200 scientific papers and several books. One of his recent books, Virtual Topology and Functor Geometry, provides an introduction to noncommutative topology.

At the occasion of his 60th birthday, a conference in his honour was held in Almería, September 18 to 22, 2007; on March 25, 2011, he received his first honorary doctorate from that same university, Universidad de Almería. At the campus of Universidad de Almería the street "Calle Fred Van Oystaeyen" (previously "Calle los Gallardos") is named after him. In 2019, he received another honorary doctorate from the Vrije Universiteit Brussel.

== Books ==
- Hidetoshi Marubayashi, Fred Van Oystaeyen: Prime Divisors and Noncommutative Valuation Theory, Springer, 2012, ISBN 978-3-6423-1151-2
- Fred Van Oystaeyen: Virtual topology and functor geometry, Chapman & Hall, 2008, ISBN 978-1-4200-6056-0
- Constantin Nastasescu, Freddy van Oystaeyen: Methods of graded rings, Lecture Notes in Mathematics 1836, Springer, February 2004, ISBN 978-3-540-20746-7
- Freddy van Oystaeyen: Algebraic geometry for associative algebras, M. Dekker, New York, 2000, ISBN 0-8247-0424-X
- F. van Oystaeyen, A. Verschoren: Relative invariants of rings: the noncommutative theory, M. Dekker, New York, 1984, ISBN 0-8247-7281-4
- F. van Oystaeyen, A. Verschoren: Relative invariants of rings: the commutative theory, M. Dekker, New York, 1983, ISBN 0-8247-7043-9
- Freddy M.J. van Oystaeyen, Alain H.M.J. Verschoren: Non-commutative algebraic geometry: an introduction, Springer-Verlag, 1981, ISBN 0-387-11153-0
- F. van Oystaeyen, A. Verschoren: Reflectors and localization : application to sheaf theory, M. Dekker, New York, 1979, ISBN 0-8247-6844-2
- F. van Oystaeyen: Prime spectra in non-commutative algebra, Springer-Verlag, 1975, ISBN 0-8247-0424-X
