= Wholeness and the Implicate Order =

1980 book by David Bohm

- First edition
- Author: David Bohm
- Language: English
- Subject: Science, Quantum mind
- Publisher: Routledge
- Publication date: 1980
- Publication place: United Kingdom
- ISBN: 0-203-99515-5

Wholeness and the Implicate Order is a book by theoretical physicist David Bohm. It was originally published in 1980 by Routledge, United Kingdom.

The book is considered a basic reference for Bohm's concepts of undivided wholeness and of implicate and explicate orders, as well as of Bohm's rheomode—an experimental language based on verbs. The book is cited, for example, by philosopher Steven M. Rosen in his book The Self-evolving Cosmos, by mathematician and theologian Kevin J. Sharpe in his book David Bohm's World, by theologian Joseph P. Farrell in Babylon's Banksters, and by theologian John C. Polkinghorne in his book One World.

== Chapters ==
1. Fragmentation and wholeness
2. The rheomode – an experiment with language and thought
3. Reality and knowledge considered as process
4. Hidden variables in the quantum theory
5. Quantum theory as an indication of a new order in physics, Part A: The development of new orders as shown through the history of physics
6. Quantum theory as an indication of a new order in physics, Part B: Implicate and explicate order in physical law
7. The enfolding-unfolding universe and consciousness

== See also ==
- Process philosophy
