= Pregeometry (physics) =

Structure from which the geometry of the universe arises

In physics, a pregeometry is a hypothetical structure from which the geometry of the universe develops. Some cosmological models feature a pregeometric universe before the Big Bang. The term was championed by John Archibald Wheeler in the 1960s and 1970s as a possible route to a theory of quantum gravity. Since quantum mechanics allowed a metric to fluctuate, it was argued that the merging of gravity with quantum mechanics required a set of more fundamental rules regarding connectivity that were independent of topology and dimensionality. Where geometry could describe the properties of a known surface, the physics of a hypothetical region with predefined properties, "pregeometry" might allow one to work with deeper underlying rules of physics that were not so strongly dependent on simplified classical assumptions about the properties of space.

No single proposal for pregeometry has gained wide consensus support in the physics community. Some notions related to pregeometry predate Wheeler, other notions depart considerably from his outline of pregeometry but are still associated with it. A 2006 paper provided a survey and critique of pregeometry or near-pregeometry proposals up to that time. A summary of these is given below:

Discrete spacetime by Hill
A proposal anticipating Wheeler's pregeometry, though assuming some geometric notions embedded in quantum mechanics and special relativity. A subgroup of Lorentz transformations with only rational coefficients is deployed. Energy and momentum variables are restricted to a certain set of rational numbers. Quantum wave functions work out to be a special case semi-periodical functions though the nature of wave functions is ambiguous since the energy-momentum space cannot be uniquely interpreted.

Discrete-space structure by Dadić and Pisk
Spacetime as an unlabeled graph whose topological structure entirely characterizes the graph. Spatial points are related to vertices. Operators define the creation or annihilation of lines which develop into a Fock space framework. This discrete-space structure assumes the metric of spacetime and assumes composite geometric objects so it is not a pregeometric scheme in line with Wheeler's original conception of pregeometry.

Pregeometric graph by Wilson
Spacetime is described by a generalized graph consisting of a very large or infinite set of vertices paired with a very large or infinite set of edges. From that graph emerge various constructions such as vertices with multiple edges, loops, and directed edges. These in turn support formulations of the metrical foundation of space-time.

Number theory pregeometry by Volovich
Spacetime as a non-Archimedean geometry over a field of rational numbers and a finite Galois field where rational numbers themselves undergo quantum fluctuations.

Causal sets by Bombelli, Lee, Meyer and Sorkin
All of spacetime at very small scales is a causal set consisting of locally finite set of elements with a partial order linked to the notion of past and future in macroscopic spacetime and causality between point-events. Derived from the causal order is the differential structure and the conformal metric of a manifold. A probability is assigned to a causal set becoming embedded in a manifold; thus there can be a transition from a discrete Planck scale fundamental unit of volume to a classical large scale continuous space.

Random graphs by Antonsen
Spacetime is described by dynamical graphs with points (associated with vertices) and links (of unit length) that are created or annihilated according to probability calculations. The parameterization of graphs in a metaspace gives rise to time.

Bootstrap universe by Cahill and Klinger
An iterative map composed of monads and the relations between them becomes a tree-graph of nodes and links. A definition of distance between any two monads is defined and from this and probabilistic mathematical tools emerges a three-dimensional space.

Axiomatic pregeometry by Perez-Bergliaffa, Romero and Vucetich
An assortment of ontological presuppositions describes spacetime a result of relations between objectively existing entities. From presuppositions emerges the topology and metric of Minkowski spacetime.

Cellular networks by Requardt
Space is described by a graph with densely entangled sub-clusters of nodes (with differential states) and bonds (either vanishing at 0 or directed at 1). Rules describe the evolution of the graph from a chaotic patternless pre-Big Bang condition to a stable spacetime in the present. Time emerges from a deeper external-parameter "clock-time" and the graphs lead to a natural metrical structure.

Simplicial quantum gravity by Lehto, Nielsen and Ninomiya
Spacetime is described as having a deeper pregeometric structure based on three dynamical variables, vertices of an abstract simplicial complex, and a real-valued field associated with every pair of vertices; the abstract simplicial complex is set to correspond with a geometric simplicial complex and then geometric simplices are stitched together into a piecewise linear space. Developed further, triangulation, link distance, a piecewise linear manifold, and a spacetime metric arise. Further, a lattice quantization is formulated resulting in a quantum gravity description of spacetime.

Quantum automaton universe by Jaroszkiewicz and Eakins
Event states (elementary or entangled) are provided topological relationships via tests (Hermitian operators) endowing the event states with evolution, irreversible acquisition of information, and a quantum arrow of time. Information content in various ages of the universe modifies the tests so the universe acts as an automaton, modifying its structure. Causal set theory is then worked out within this quantum automaton framework to describe a spacetime that inherits the assumptions of geometry within standard quantum mechanics.

Rational-number spacetime by Horzela, Kapuścik, Kempczyński and Uzes
A preliminary investigation into how all events might be mapped with rational number coordinates and how this might help to better understand a discrete spacetime framework.
