= David Bohm =

American-Brazilian-British scientist (1917–1992)

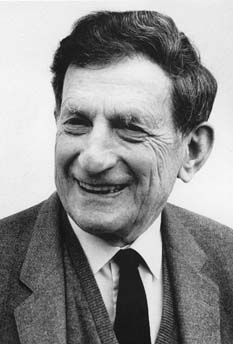
- Born: David Joseph Bohm; 20 December 1917; Wilkes-Barre, Pennsylvania, US
- Died: 27 October 1992 (aged 74); London, England, UK
- Citizenship: American; Brazilian; British
- Education: Pennsylvania State College (BS); University of California, Berkeley (PhD)
- Known for: Aharonov–Bohm effect; De Broglie–Bohm theory; Bohm criterion; Bohm-diffusion; Bohm dialogue; Bohm's EPR experiment; Bohm interpretation; Bohm quantum potential; Hidden variable theory; Pilot wave theory; Holographic paradigm; Holomovement; Holonomic brain theory; Nonradiation condition; Pilot wave; Plasmon; Implicate and explicate order; Random phase approximation; Quantum decoherence; Quantum mind
- Awards: 1991 Elliott Cresson Medal; 1990 Royal Society fellowship
- Scientific career
- Fields: Theoretical physics
- Workplaces: Princeton University; University of São Paulo; Technion; University of Bristol; Birkbeck College, London
- Doctoral advisor: Robert Oppenheimer
- Doctoral students: Y. Aharonov; D. Pines; J. Bub; H. Bortoft; Eugene P. Gross

David Joseph Bohm (/boʊm/; 20 December 1917 – 27 October 1992) was an American-Brazilian physicist who has been described as one of the most significant theoretical physicists of the 20th century and who contributed unorthodox ideas to quantum theory, neuropsychology, and the philosophy of mind. Among his many contributions to physics is his causal and deterministic interpretation of quantum theory, known as De Broglie–Bohm theory.

Bohm advanced the view that quantum physics meant that the old Cartesian model of reality—that there are two kinds of substance, the mental and the physical, that somehow interact—was too limited. To complement it, he developed a mathematical and physical theory of "implicate" and "explicate" order. He also believed that the brain, at the cellular level, works according to the mathematics of some quantum effects, and postulated that thought is distributed and non-localised just as quantum entities are. Bohm's main concern was with understanding the nature of reality in general and of consciousness in particular as a coherent whole, which according to Bohm is never static or complete.

Bohm warned of the dangers of rampant reason and technology, advocating instead the need for genuine supportive dialogue, which he claimed could bridge and unify conflicting and troublesome divisions in the social world.

Born in the United States, Bohm obtained his Ph.D. under J. Robert Oppenheimer at the University of California, Berkeley. His Communist affiliations made him the subject of a federal government investigation in 1949, leading to his suspension from Princeton University and prompting him to leave the U.S. He pursued his career in several countries, becoming first a Brazilian and then a British citizen. He abandoned Marxism in the wake of the Hungarian Uprising in 1956.

== Youth and college ==
Bohm was born in Wilkes-Barre, Pennsylvania, to an Austrian Jewish immigrant father, Samuel Bohm, and a Lithuanian Jewish mother, Frieda Popky. He was raised mainly by his father, a furniture-store owner and assistant of the local rabbi. Despite being raised in a Jewish family, he became an agnostic in his teenage years. Bohm attended Pennsylvania State College (now Pennsylvania State University), graduating in 1939, and then the California Institute of Technology, for one year. He then transferred to the theoretical physics group directed by Robert Oppenheimer at the University of California, Berkeley Radiation Laboratory, where he obtained his doctorate.

Bohm lived in the same neighborhood as some of Oppenheimer's other graduate students (Giovanni Rossi Lomanitz, Joseph Weinberg, and Max Friedman) and with them became increasingly involved in radical politics. He was active in communist and communist-backed organizations, including the Young Communist League, the Campus Committee to Fight Conscription, and the Committee for Peace Mobilization. During his time at the Radiation Laboratory, Bohm was in a relationship with Betty Friedan and also helped to organize a local chapter of the Federation of Architects, Engineers, Chemists and Technicians, a small labor union affiliated to the Congress of Industrial Organizations (CIO).

== Work and doctorate ==
=== Manhattan Project contributions ===
During World War II, the Manhattan Project mobilized much of Berkeley's physics research in the effort to produce the first atomic bomb. Though Oppenheimer had asked Bohm to work with him at Los Alamos (the top-secret laboratory established in 1942 to design the atom bomb), the project's director, Brigadier General Leslie Groves, would not approve Bohm's security clearance after seeing evidence of his politics and his close friendship with Weinberg, who had been suspected of espionage.

During the war, Bohm remained at Berkeley, where he taught physics and conducted research in plasma, the synchrotron and the synchrocyclotron. He completed his PhD in 1943 by an unusual circumstance. According to biographer F. David Peat, "The scattering calculations (of collisions of protons and deuterons) that he had completed proved useful to the Manhattan Project and were immediately classified. Without security clearance, Bohm was denied access to his own work; not only would he be barred from defending his thesis, he was not even allowed to write his own thesis in the first place!" To satisfy the university, Oppenheimer certified that Bohm had successfully completed the research. Bohm later performed theoretical calculations for the Calutrons at the Y-12 facility in Oak Ridge, Tennessee. These calculations were used for the electromagnetic enrichment of uranium for the bomb dropped on Hiroshima in 1945.

=== McCarthyism and leaving the United States ===
After the war, Bohm became an assistant professor at Princeton University. He also worked closely with Albert Einstein at the nearby Institute for Advanced Study. In May 1949, the House Un-American Activities Committee called upon Bohm to testify because of his previous ties to unionism and suspected communists. Bohm invoked his Fifth Amendment right to refuse to testify, and he refused to give evidence against his colleagues.

In 1950, Bohm was arrested for refusing to answer the committee's questions. He was acquitted in May 1951, but Princeton had already suspended him. After his acquittal, Bohm's colleagues sought to have him reinstated at Princeton, but Princeton President Harold W. Dodds decided not to renew Bohm's contract. Although Einstein considered appointing him as his research assistant at the institute, IAS President Oppenheimer "opposed the idea and [...] advised his former student to leave the country". His request to go to the University of Manchester received Einstein's support but was unsuccessful. Bohm then left for Brazil to assume a professorship of physics at the University of São Paulo, at Jayme Tiomno's invitation and on the recommendation of both Einstein and Oppenheimer.

=== Quantum theory and Bohm diffusion ===
The Bohmian trajectories for an electron going through the two-slit experiment. A similar pattern was also observed for single photons.

During his early period, Bohm made a number of significant contributions to physics, particularly quantum mechanics and relativity theory. As a postgraduate at Berkeley, he developed a theory of plasmas, discovering the electron phenomenon known as Bohm diffusion. His first book, Quantum Theory, published in 1951, was well received by Einstein, among others. But Bohm became dissatisfied with the orthodox interpretation of quantum theory he wrote about in that book. Starting from the realization that the WKB approximation of quantum mechanics leads to deterministic equations and convinced that a mere approximation could not turn a probabilistic theory into a deterministic theory, he doubted the inevitability of the conventional approach to quantum mechanics.

Bohm's aim was not to set out a deterministic, mechanical viewpoint but to show that it was possible to attribute properties to an underlying reality, in contrast to the conventional approach. He began to develop his own interpretation (the De Broglie–Bohm theory, also called the pilot wave theory), the predictions of which agreed perfectly with the non-deterministic quantum theory. He initially called his approach a hidden variable theory, but he later called it ontological theory, reflecting his view that a stochastic process underlying the phenomena described by his theory might one day be found. Bohm and his colleague Basil Hiley later stated that they had found their own choice of terms of an "interpretation in terms of hidden variables" to be too restrictive, especially since their variables, position and momentum, "are not actually hidden".

Bohm's work and the EPR argument became the major factor motivating John Stewart Bell's inequality, which rules out local hidden variable theories; the full consequences of Bell's work are still being investigated.

=== Brazil ===
When Bohm arrived in Brazil on 10 October 1951, the US Consul in São Paulo confiscated his passport, informing him he could retrieve it only to return to his country, which reportedly frightened Bohm and significantly lowered his spirits, as he had hoped to travel to Europe. He applied for and received Brazilian citizenship, but by law, had to give up his US citizenship; he was able to reclaim it only decades later, in 1986, after pursuing a lawsuit.

At the University of São Paulo, Bohm worked on the causal theory that became the subject of his publications in 1952. Jean-Pierre Vigier traveled to São Paulo, where he worked with Bohm for three months; Ralph Schiller, student of cosmologist Peter Bergmann, was his assistant for two years; he worked with Tiomno and Walther Schützer; and Mario Bunge stayed to work with him for one year. He was in contact with Brazilian physicists Mário Schenberg, Jean Meyer, Leite Lopes, and had discussions on occasion with visitors to Brazil, including Richard Feynman, Isidor Rabi, Léon Rosenfeld, Carl Friedrich von Weizsäcker, Herbert L. Anderson, Donald Kerst, Marcos Moshinsky, Alejandro Medina, and the former assistant to Heisenberg, Guido Beck, who encouraged him in his work and helped him obtain funding. The Brazilian CNPq explicitly supported his work on the causal theory and funded several researchers around Bohm. His work with Vigier was the beginning of a long-standing cooperation between the two and Louis De Broglie, in particular, on connections to the hydrodynamics model proposed by Madelung.

Yet the causal theory met much resistance and skepticism, with many physicists holding the Copenhagen interpretation to be the only viable approach to quantum mechanics. Bohm and Vigier both emphasized causality, not determinism. In this context, Bohm proposed a causal approach in which the material world could be represented at an infinite number of levels, with stochastic dynamics at every level.

From 1951 to 1953, Bohm and David Pines published the articles in which they introduced the random phase approximation and proposed the plasmon.

=== Bohm and Aharonov form of the EPR paradox ===
In 1955, Bohm relocated to Israel, where he spent two years working at the Technion, in Haifa. There, he met Sarah Woolfson, whom he married in 1956. In 1957, Bohm and his student Yakir Aharonov published a new version of the Einstein–Podolsky–Rosen (EPR) paradox, reformulating the original argument in terms of spin. It was that form of the EPR paradox that was discussed by John Stewart Bell in his famous paper of 1964.

=== Aharonov–Bohm effect ===
Schematic of double-slit experiment in which Aharonov–Bohm effect can be observed: electrons pass through two slits, interfering at an observation screen, with the interference pattern shifted when a magnetic field B is turned on in the cylindrical solenoid.

In 1957, Bohm relocated to the United Kingdom as a research fellow at the University of Bristol. In 1959, Bohm and Aharonov discovered the Aharonov–Bohm effect, showing how a magnetic field could affect a region of space in which the field had been shielded, but its vector potential did not vanish there. That showed for the first time that the magnetic vector potential, hitherto a mathematical convenience, could have real physical (quantum) effects.

In 1961, Bohm was made professor of theoretical physics at the University of London's Birkbeck College, becoming emeritus in 1987. His collected papers are stored there.

=== Implicate and explicate order ===
At Birkbeck College, much of the work of Bohm and Basil Hiley expanded on the notion of implicate, explicate, and generative orders proposed by Bohm. In the view of Bohm and Hiley, "things, such as particles, objects, and indeed subjects" exist as "semi-autonomous quasi-local features" of an underlying activity. Such features can be considered to be independent only up to a certain level of approximation in which certain criteria are fulfilled. In that picture, the classical limit for quantum phenomena, in terms of a condition that the action function is not much greater than the Planck constant, indicates one such criterion. They used the word "holomovement" for the activity in such orders.

=== Holonomic model of the brain ===
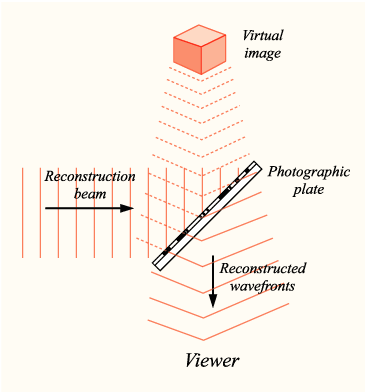
In a holographic reconstruction, each region of a photographic plate contains the whole image.

In collaboration with Stanford University neuroscientist Karl H. Pribram, Bohm was involved in the early development of the holonomic model of the functioning of the brain, a model for human cognition that is drastically different from conventionally-accepted ideas. Bohm worked with Pribram on the theory that the brain operates in a manner that is similar to a hologram, in accordance with quantum mathematical principles and the characteristics of wave patterns.

=== Consciousness and thought ===
In addition to his scientific work, Bohm was deeply interested in exploring the nature of consciousness, with particular attention to the role of thought as it relates to attention, motivation, and conflict in the individual and in society. Those concerns were a natural extension of his earlier interest in Marxist ideology and Hegelian philosophy. His views were brought into sharper focus through extensive interactions with the philosopher, speaker, and writer Jiddu Krishnamurti, beginning in 1961. Their collaboration lasted a quarter of a century, and their recorded dialogues were published in several volumes.

Bohm's prolonged involvement with the philosophy of Krishnamurti was regarded somewhat skeptically by some of his scientific peers. An examination in 2017 of the relationship between the two men presents it in a more positive light and shows that Bohm's work in the psychological field was complementary to and compatible with his contributions to theoretical physics.

The mature expression of Bohm's views in the psychological field was presented in a seminar conducted in 1990 at the Oak Grove School, founded by Krishnamurti in Ojai, California. It was one of a series of seminars held by Bohm at Oak Grove School, and it was published as Thought as a System. In the seminar, Bohm described the pervasive influence of thought throughout society, including the many erroneous assumptions about the nature of thought and its effects in daily life.

In the seminar, Bohm develops several interrelated themes. He points out that thought is the ubiquitous tool that is used to solve every kind of problem: personal, social, scientific, and so on. Yet thought, he maintains, is also inadvertently the source of many of those problems. He recognizes and acknowledges the irony of the situation: it is as if one gets sick by going to the doctor.

Bohm maintains that thought is a system, in the sense that it is an interconnected network of concepts, ideas and assumptions that pass seamlessly between individuals and throughout society. If there is a fault in the functioning of thought, therefore, it must be a systemic fault, which infects the entire network. The thought that is brought to bear to resolve any given problem, therefore, is susceptible to the same flaw that created the problem it is trying to solve.

Thought proceeds as if it is merely reporting objectively, but in fact, it is often coloring and distorting perception in unexpected ways. What is required in order to correct the distortions introduced by thought, according to Bohm, is a form of proprioception, or self-awareness. Neural receptors throughout the body inform us directly of our physical position and movement, but there is no corresponding awareness of the activity of thought. Such an awareness would represent psychological proprioception and would enable the possibility of perceiving and correcting the unintended consequences of the thinking process.

=== Further interests ===
In his book On Creativity, quoting Alfred Korzybski, the Polish-American who developed the field of General Semantics, Bohm expressed the view that "metaphysics is an expression of a world view" and is "thus to be regarded as an art form, resembling poetry in some ways and mathematics in others, rather than as an attempt to say something true about reality as a whole".

Bohm was keenly aware of various ideas outside the scientific mainstream. In his book Science, Order and Creativity, Bohm referred to the views of various biologists on the evolution of the species, including Rupert Sheldrake. He also knew the ideas of Wilhelm Reich.

Contrary to many other scientists, Bohm did not exclude the paranormal out of hand. Bohm temporarily even held Uri Geller's bending of keys and spoons to be possible, prompting warning remarks by his colleague Basil Hiley that it might undermine the scientific credibility of their work in physics. Martin Gardner reported this in a Skeptical Inquirer article and also critiqued the views of Jiddu Krishnamurti, with whom Bohm had met in 1959 and had had many subsequent exchanges. Gardner said that Bohm's view of the interconnectedness of mind and matter "flirted with panpsychism" (on one occasion, Bohm summarized: "Even the electron is informed with a certain level of mind.").

=== Bohm dialogue ===
To address societal problems during his later years, Bohm wrote a proposal for a solution that has become known as "Bohm Dialogue", in which equal status and "free space" form the most important prerequisites of communication and the appreciation of differing personal beliefs. An essential ingredient in this form of dialogue is that participants "suspend" immediate action or judgment and give themselves and each other the opportunity to become aware of the thought process itself. Bohm suggested that if the "dialogue groups" were experienced on a sufficiently wide scale, they could help overcome the isolation and fragmentation that Bohm observed in society.

== Later life ==
Bohm continued his work in quantum physics after his retirement, in 1987. His final work, the posthumously published The Undivided Universe: An Ontological Interpretation of Quantum Theory (1993), resulted from a decades-long collaboration with Basil Hiley. He also spoke to audiences across Europe and North America on the importance of dialogue as a form of sociotherapy, a concept he borrowed from London psychiatrist and practitioner of Group Analysis Patrick de Maré, and he had a series of meetings with the Dalai Lama. He was elected Fellow of the Royal Society in 1990.

Near the end of his life, Bohm began to experience a recurrence of the depression that he had suffered earlier in life. He was admitted to the Maudsley Hospital in South London on 10 May 1991. His condition worsened and it was decided that the only treatment that might help him was electroconvulsive therapy. Bohm's wife consulted psychiatrist David Shainberg, Bohm's longtime friend and collaborator, who agreed that electroconvulsive treatments were probably his only option. Bohm showed improvement from the treatments and was released on 29 August, but his depression returned and was treated with medication.

On the day he died, Bohm said: "You know, it's tantalizing. I feel I'm on the edge of something."

Bohm died after suffering a heart attack in Hendon, London, on 27 October 1992, aged 74.

The film Infinite Potential is based on Bohm's life and studies; it adopts the same name as the biography by F. David Peat.

== Reception of causal theory ==
In the early 1950s, Bohm's causal quantum theory of hidden variables was mostly negatively received, with a widespread tendency among physicists to systematically ignore both Bohm personally and his ideas. There was a significant revival of interest in Bohm's ideas in the late 1950s and the early 1960s; the Ninth Symposium of the Colston Research Society in Bristol in 1957 was a key turning point toward greater tolerance of his ideas.

== Publications ==
- 1951. Quantum Theory, New York: Prentice Hall. 1989 reprint, New York: Dover, ISBN 0-486-65969-0
- 1957. Causality and Chance in Modern Physics, 1961 Harper edition reprinted in 1980 by Philadelphia: U of Pennsylvania Press, ISBN 0-8122-1002-6
- 1962. Quanta and Reality, A Symposium, with N. R. Hanson and Mary B. Hesse, from a BBC program published by the American Research Council
- 1965. The Special Theory of Relativity, New York: W.A. Benjamin.
- 1980. Wholeness and the Implicate Order, London: Routledge, ISBN 0-7100-0971-2, 1983 Ark paperback: ISBN 0-7448-0000-5, 2002 paperback: ISBN 0-415-28979-3
- 1985. Unfolding Meaning: A weekend of dialogue with David Bohm (Donald Factor, editor), Gloucestershire: Foundation House, ISBN 0-948325-00-3, 1987 Ark paperback: ISBN 0-7448-0064-1, 1996 Routledge paperback: ISBN 0-415-13638-5
- 1985. The Ending of Time, with Jiddu Krishnamurti, San Francisco: Harper, ISBN 0-06-064796-5.
- 1987. Science, Order, and Creativity, with F. David Peat. London: Routledge. 2nd ed. 2000. ISBN 0-415-17182-2.
- 1989. Meaning And Information, In: P. Pylkkänen (ed.): The Search for Meaning: The New Spirit in Science and Philosophy, Crucible, The Aquarian Press, 1989, ISBN 978-1-85274-061-0.
- 1991. Changing Consciousness: Exploring the Hidden Source of the Social, Political and Environmental Crises Facing our World (a dialogue of words and images), coauthor Mark Edwards, Harper San Francisco, ISBN 0-06-250072-4
- 1992. Thought as a System (transcript of seminar held in Ojai, California, from 30 November to 2 December 1990), London: Routledge. ISBN 0-415-11980-4.
- 1993. The Undivided Universe: An ontological interpretation of quantum theory, with B.J. Hiley, London: Routledge, ISBN 0-415-12185-X (final work)
- 1996. On Dialogue. editor Lee Nichol. London: Routledge, hardcover: ISBN 0-415-14911-8, paperback: ISBN 0-415-14912-6, 2004 edition: ISBN 0-415-33641-4
- 1998. On Creativity, editor Lee Nichol. London: Routledge, hardcover: ISBN 0-415-17395-7, paperback: ISBN 0-415-17396-5, 2004 edition: ISBN 0-415-33640-6
- 1999. Limits of Thought: Discussions, with Jiddu Krishnamurti, London: Routledge, ISBN 0-415-19398-2.
- 1999. Bohm–Biederman Correspondence: Creativity and Science, with Charles Biederman. editor Paavo Pylkkänen. ISBN 0-415-16225-4.
- 2002. The Essential David Bohm. editor Lee Nichol. London: Routledge, ISBN 0-415-26174-0. preface by the Dalai Lama
- 2017. David Bohm: Causality and Chance, Letters to Three Women, editor Chris Talbot. Cham, Switzerland: Springer. ISBN 978-3-319-55491-4.
- 2018. The Unity of Everything: A Conversation with David Bohm, with Nish Dubashia. Hamburg, Germany: Tredition, ISBN 978-3-7439-9299-3.
- 2020. David Bohm's Critique of Modern Physics, Letters to Jeffrey Bub, 1966–1969, Foreword by Jeffrey Bub, editor Chris Talbot. Cham, Switzerland: Springer. ISBN 978-3-030-45536-1.

== See also ==
- American philosophy
- Bohm sheath criterion
- Karl H. Pribram
- List of American philosophers
- Orchestrated objective reduction
- Quantum mind#Bohm and Hiley
- Quantum mysticism
- Random phase approximation
- The Holographic Universe

== Sources ==
- David Z. Albert (May 1994). "Bohm's Alternative to Quantum Mechanics". Scientific American. 270 (5): 58. Bibcode:1994SciAm.270e..58A. doi:10.1038/scientificamerican0594-58.
- Joye, S.R. (2017). The Little Book of Consciousness: Pribram's Holonomic Brain Theory and Bohm's Implicate Order. The Viola Institute. ISBN 978-0-9988785-4-6.
- Greeg Herken (2002). Brotherhood of the Bomb: The Tangled Lives and Loyalties of Robert Oppenheimer, Ernest Lawrence, and Edward Teller. Holt. ISBN 0-8050-6589-X. (information on Bohm's work at Berkeley and his dealings with HUAC)
- F. David Peat (1997). Infinite Potential: the Life and Times of David Bohm. Addison Wesley. ISBN 0-201-40635-7.
- B.J. Hiley, F. David Peat, ed. (1987). Quantum Implications: Essays in Honour of David Bohm. Routledge. ISBN 0-415-06960-2.
- David Bohm; Sarah Bohm (1992). Thought as a System. Routledge. ISBN 0-415-11980-4. (transcript of seminar held in Ojai, California, from 30 November to 2 December 1990)
- Peter R. Holland (2000). The Quantum Theory of Motion: an account of the de Broglie-Bohm Causal Interpretation of Quantum Mechanics. Cambridge University Press. ISBN 0-521-48543-6.
