= Luigi Fantappiè =

Italian mathematician (1901–1956)

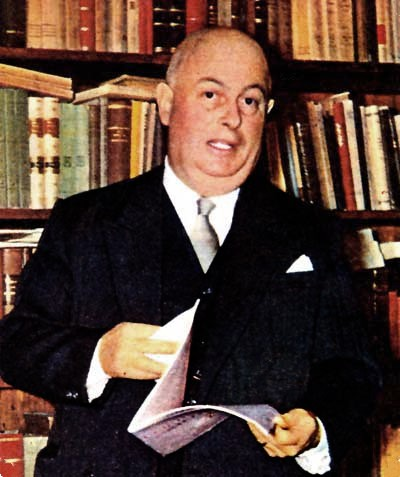
- Born: 15 September 1901; Viterbo, Italy
- Died: 28 July 1956 (aged 55); Viterbo, Italy
- Education: University of Pisa
- Known for: Theory of analytic functionals
- Scientific career
- Fields: Mathematics
- Workplaces: University of Bologna; University of Cagliari; University of Palermo; University of São Paulo; Sapienza University of Rome
- Doctoral advisor: Luigi Bianchi
- Other academic advisors: Francesco Severi; Vito Volterra
- Doctoral students: Giuseppe Arcidiacono

Luigi Fantappiè (15 September 1901 – 28 July 1956) was an Italian mathematician, known for work in mathematical analysis and for creating the theory of analytic functionals: he was a student and follower of Vito Volterra. Later in life, he proposed scientific theories of sweeping scope.

== Biography ==
Luigi Fantappiè was born in Viterbo, and studied at the University of Pisa, graduating in mathematics in 1922. After time spent abroad, he was offered a chair by the University of Florence in 1926, and a year later by the University of Palermo. He spent the years 1934 to 1939 in the University of São Paulo, Brazil collaborating with Benedito Castrucci notorious Italian-Brazilian mathematician. In 1939 he was offered a chair at the University of Rome.

In 1941 he discovered that negative entropy has qualities that are associated with life: The cause of processes driven by negative energy lies in the future, exactly such as living beings work for a better day tomorrow. A process that is driven by negative entropy will increase order with time, such as all forms of life tend to do. This was a very controversial view at the time and not at all accepted by his colleagues. His findings indicate that negative entropy is associated with life in the same way as consciousness is. Consciousness could be a process based on negative entropy. In 1942 he put forth a unified theory of physics and biology and the syntropy concept. In 1952 he started to work on a unified physical theory called projective relativity, for which, he asserted, special relativity was a limiting case. Giuseppe Arcidiacono worked with him on this theory.

He tried to combine his scientific research with his Catholic faith.

== See also ==
- Analytic functional
- Andreotti–Norguet formula
- de Sitter invariant special relativity
- Negentropy

== Books ==
- Principi di una teoria unitaria del mondo fisico e biologico. Rome: Di Renzo Editore.
- Conferenze scelte. Rome: Di Renzo Editore.
