= De Sitter invariant special relativity =

Special relativity formed using the SO(4,1) symmetry group

In mathematical physics, de Sitter invariant special relativity is the speculative idea that the fundamental symmetry group of spacetime is the indefinite orthogonal group SO(4,1), that of de Sitter space. In the standard theory of general relativity, de Sitter space is a highly symmetrical special vacuum solution, which requires a cosmological constant or the stress–energy of a constant scalar field to sustain.

The idea of de Sitter invariant relativity is to require that the laws of physics are not fundamentally invariant under the Poincaré group of special relativity, but under the symmetry group of de Sitter space instead. With this assumption, empty space automatically has de Sitter symmetry, and what would normally be called the cosmological constant in general relativity becomes a fundamental dimensional parameter describing the symmetry structure of spacetime.

First proposed by Luigi Fantappiè in 1954, the theory remained obscure until it was rediscovered in 1968 by Henri Bacry and Jean-Marc Lévy-Leblond. In 1972, Freeman Dyson popularized it as a hypothetical road by which mathematicians could have guessed part of the structure of general relativity before it was discovered. The discovery of the accelerating expansion of the universe has led to a revival of interest in de Sitter invariant theories, in conjunction with other speculative proposals for new physics, like doubly special relativity.

== Introduction ==
De Sitter suggested that spacetime curvature might not be due solely to gravity but he did not give any mathematical details of how this could be accomplished. In 1968 Henri Bacry and Jean-Marc Lévy-Leblond showed that the de Sitter group was the most general group compatible with isotropy, homogeneity and boost invariance. Later, Freeman Dyson advocated this as an approach to making the mathematical structure of general relativity more self-evident.

Minkowski's unification of space and time within special relativity replaces the Galilean group of Newtonian mechanics with the Lorentz group. This is called a unification of space and time because the Lorentz group is simple, while the Galilean group is a semi-direct product of rotations and Galilean boosts. This means that the Lorentz group mixes up space and time such that they cannot be disentangled, while the Galilean group treats time as a parameter with different units of measurement than space.

An analogous thing can be made to happen with the ordinary rotation group in three dimensions. If you imagine a nearly flat world, one in which pancake-like creatures wander around on a pancake flat world, their conventional unit of height might be the micrometre (μm), since that is how high typical structures are in their world, while their unit of distance could be the metre, because that is their body's horizontal extent. Such creatures would describe the basic symmetry of their world as SO(2), being the known rotations in the horizontal (x–y) plane. Later on, they might discover rotations around the x- and y-axes—and in their everyday experience such rotations might always be by an infinitesimal angle, so that these rotations would effectively commute with each other.

The rotations around the horizontal axes would tilt objects by an infinitesimal amount. The tilt in the x–z plane (the "x-tilt") would be one parameter, and the tilt in the y–z plane (the "y-tilt") another. The symmetry group of this pancake world is then SO(2) semidirect product with R^{2}, meaning that a two-dimensional rotation plus two extra parameters, the x-tilt and the y-tilt. The reason it is a semidirect product is that, when you rotate, the x-tilt and the y-tilt rotate into each other, since they form a vector and not two scalars. In this world, the difference in height between two objects at the same x, y would be a rotationally invariant quantity unrelated to length and width. The z-coordinate is effectively separate from x and y.

Eventually, experiments at large angles would convince the creatures that the symmetry of the world is SO(3). Then they would understand that z is really the same as x and y, since they can be mixed up by rotations. The SO(2) semidirect product R^{2} limit would be understood as the limit that the free parameter μ, the ratio of the height range μm to the length range m, approaches 0. The Lorentz group is analogous—it is a simple group that turns into the Galilean group when the time range is made long compared to the space range, or where velocities may be regarded as infinitesimal, or equivalently, may be regarded as the limit c → ∞, where relativistic effects become observable "as good as at infinite velocity".

The symmetry group of special relativity is not entirely simple, due to translations. The Lorentz group is the set of the transformations that keep the origin fixed, but translations are not included. The full Poincaré group is the semi-direct product of translations with the Lorentz group. If translations are to be similar to elements of the Lorentz group, then as boosts are non-commutative, translations would also be non-commutative.

In the pancake world, this would manifest if the creatures were living on an enormous sphere rather than on a plane. In this case, when they wander around their sphere, they would eventually come to realize that translations are not entirely separate from rotations, because if they move around on the surface of a sphere, when they come back to where they started, they find that they have been rotated by the holonomy of parallel transport on the sphere. If the universe is the same everywhere (homogeneous) and there are no preferred directions (isotropic), then there are not many options for the symmetry group: they either live on a flat plane, or on a sphere with a constant positive curvature, or on a Lobachevski plane with constant negative curvature. If they are not living on the plane, they can describe positions using dimensionless angles, the same parameters that describe rotations, so that translations and rotations are nominally unified.

In relativity, if translations mix up nontrivially with rotations, but the universe is still homogeneous and isotropic, the only option is that spacetime has a uniform scalar curvature. If the curvature is positive, the analog of the sphere case for the two-dimensional creatures, the spacetime is de Sitter space and its symmetry group is the de Sitter group rather than the Poincaré group.

De Sitter special relativity postulates that the empty space has de Sitter symmetry as a fundamental law of nature. This means that spacetime is slightly curved even in the absence of matter or energy. This residual curvature implies a positive cosmological constant Λ to be determined by observation. Due to the small magnitude of the constant, special relativity with its Poincaré group is indistinguishable from de Sitter space for most practical purposes.

Modern proponents of this idea, such as S. Cacciatori, V. Gorini and A. Kamenshchik, have reinterpreted this theory as physics, not just mathematics. They postulate that the acceleration of the expansion of the universe is not entirely due to vacuum energy, but at least partly due to the kinematics of the de Sitter group, which would replace the Poincaré group.

A modification of this idea allows $\Lambda$ to change with time, so that inflation may come from the cosmological constant being larger near the Big Bang than nowadays. It can also be viewed as a different approach to the problem of quantum gravity.

=== High energy ===
The Poincaré group contracts to the Galilean group for low-velocity kinematics, meaning that when all velocities are small the Poincaré group "morphs" into the Galilean group. (This can be made precise with İnönü and Wigner's concept of group contraction.)

Similarly, the de Sitter group contracts to the Poincaré group for short-distance kinematics, when the magnitudes of all translations considered are very small compared to the de Sitter radius. In quantum mechanics, short distances are probed by high energies, so that for energies above a very small value related to the cosmological constant, the Poincaré group is a good approximation to the de Sitter group.

In de Sitter relativity, the cosmological constant is no longer a free parameter of the same type; it is determined by the de Sitter radius, a fundamental quantity that determines the commutation relation of translation with rotations/boosts. This means that the theory of de Sitter relativity might be able to provide insight on the value of the cosmological constant, perhaps explaining the cosmic coincidence. Unfortunately, the de Sitter radius, which determines the cosmological constant, is an adjustable parameter in de Sitter relativity, so the theory requires a separate condition to determine its value in relation to the measurement scale.

When a cosmological constant is viewed as a kinematic parameter, the definitions of energy and momentum must be changed from those of special relativity. These changes could significantly modify the physics of the early universe if the cosmological constant was greater back then. Some speculate that a high energy experiment could modify the local structure of spacetime from Minkowski space to de Sitter space with a large cosmological constant for a short period of time, and this might eventually be tested in the existing or planned particle collider.

=== Doubly special relativity ===
Since the de Sitter group naturally incorporates an invariant length parameter, de Sitter relativity can be interpreted as an example of the so-called doubly special relativity. There is a fundamental difference, though: whereas in all doubly special relativity models the Lorentz symmetry is violated, in de Sitter relativity it remains as a physical symmetry. A drawback of the usual doubly special relativity models is that they are valid only at the energy scales where ordinary special relativity is supposed to break down, giving rise to a patchwork relativity. On the other hand, de Sitter relativity is found to be invariant under a simultaneous re-scaling of mass, energy and momentum, and is consequently valid at all energy scales. A relationship between doubly special relativity, de Sitter space and general relativity is described by Derek Wise. See also MacDowell–Mansouri action.

=== Newton–Hooke: de Sitter special relativity in the limit v ≪ c ===
In the limit as v ≪ c, the de Sitter group contracts to the Newton–Hooke group. This has the effect that in the nonrelativistic limit, objects in de Sitter space have an extra "repulsion" from the origin: objects have a tendency to move away from the center with an outward pointing fictitious force proportional to their distance from the origin.

While it looks as though this might pick out a preferred point in space—the center of repulsion, it is more subtly isotropic. Moving to the uniformly accelerated frame of reference of an observer at another point, all accelerations appear to have a repulsion center at the new point.

What this means is that in a spacetime with non-vanishing curvature, gravity is modified from Newtonian gravity. At distances comparable to the radius of the space, objects feel an additional linear repulsion from the center of coordinates.

=== History of de Sitter invariant special relativity ===
- "de Sitter relativity" is the same as the theory of "projective relativity" of Luigi Fantappiè and Giuseppe Arcidiacono first published in 1954 by Fantappiè and the same as another independent discovery in 1976.
- In 1968 Henri Bacry and Jean-Marc Lévy-Leblond published a paper on possible kinematics
- In 1972 Freeman Dyson further explored this.
- In 1973 Eliano Pessa described how Fantappié–Arcidiacono projective relativity relates to earlier conceptions of projective relativity and to Kaluza Klein theory.
- R. Aldrovandi, J.P. Beltrán Almeida and J.G. Pereira have used the terms "de Sitter special relativity" and "de Sitter relativity" starting from their 2007 paper "de Sitter special relativity". This paper was based on previous work on amongst other things: the consequences of a non-vanishing cosmological constant, on doubly special relativity and on the Newton–Hooke group and early work formulating special relativity with a de Sitter space
- In 2008 S. Cacciatori, V. Gorini and A. Kamenshchik published a paper about the kinematics of de Sitter relativity.
- Papers by other authors include: dSR and the fine structure constant; dSR and dark energy; dSR Hamiltonian Formalism; and De Sitter Thermodynamics from Diamonds's Temperature, Triply special relativity from six dimensions, Deformed General Relativity and Torsion.

=== Quantum de Sitter special relativity ===
There are quantized or quantum versions of de Sitter special relativity.

Early work on formulating a quantum theory in a de Sitter space includes:

== See also ==
- Noncommutative geometry
- Quantum field theory in curved spacetime
