= Arcidiacono =

Arcidiacono is an Italian surname. Notable people with the name include:

- Angelo Arcidiacono (1955–2007), Italian fencer
- Giuseppe Arcidiacono (1927–1998), Italian physicist
- Ryan Arcidiacono (born 1994), American basketball player
