= Lighthouse paradox =

Thought experiment about the speed of light

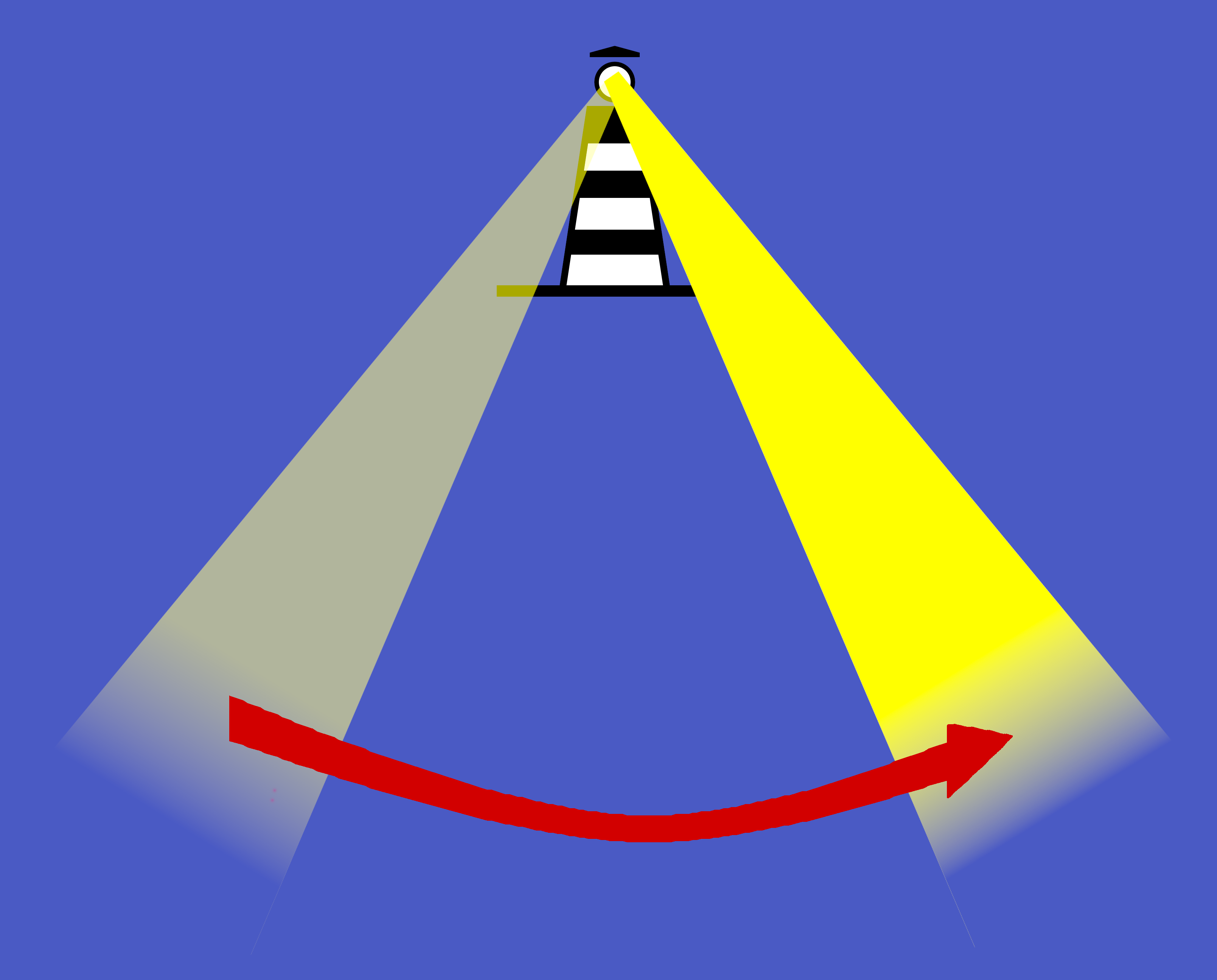
Observed distance traveled by light (from left to right) as light source rotates. At a sufficient distance, the speed at which the beam "moves" may exceed the speed of light.

The lighthouse paradox is a thought experiment in which the speed of light is apparently exceeded. The rotating beam of light from a lighthouse is imagined to be swept from one object to shine on a second object. The farther the two objects are away from the lighthouse, the farther the distance between them crossed by the light beam. If the objects are sufficiently far away from the lighthouse, the places where the beam hits object 2 will traverse the object with an apparent speed faster than light, possibly communicating a signal on object 2 with superluminal velocity, which violates Albert Einstein's theory of special relativity.

The solution to this paradox is that superluminal velocities can be observed because no actual particles or information are traveling from object 1 to object 2. The transverse velocity of the beam along the path in the sky between the objects has an apparent speed greater than light, but this represents separate photons of light. No photons are traveling the path from object 1 to object 2; the photons in the light beam are traveling a radial path outward from the lighthouse, at the speed of light. The theory of relativity says information cannot be transmitted faster than light. This experiment does not actually transmit a signal from object 1 to object 2. The time when the light beam strikes object 2 is controlled by the person at the lighthouse, not anyone on object 1, so no one on object 1 can transmit a message to object 2 by this method. Therefore, the theory of relativity is not violated.

== Paradox ==
A lighthouse sends a powerful beam of light which travels significant distances from the point of origin. This light constantly rotates in a circular motion around the lighthouse. This thought experiment proposes that light moving in this situation is actually traveling faster than the speed of light. This presents a paradox because, according to the theory of relativity, the speed of light in vacuum is the same for all observers, regardless of their relative motion or of the motion of the light source, and nothing can travel faster than this speed.

== Moon example ==
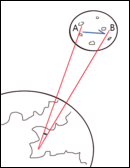
Distance observed to be traveled by laser on the moon (from point A to point B) as light source moves laterally on Earth.

A similar example can be explained by the movement of a laser across the face of the Moon. This paradox arises based on a simple principle: if someone stands a distance of "X" away from an object, and shines a laser from one side (A) of the object to the other side (B) of the object, they would have to rotate their hand by an angle "Y". Thus, as X increases, Y would decrease, as the wrist would have to rotate a smaller angle to move the laser from point A to point B. Also, correlated with a smaller angle would be a decreased time it would take to rotate the wrist (it will take a shorter time to rotate the wrist a smaller angle). With respect to distant objects like the Moon, a paradox arises when one is asked to hypothetically move a laser from one side to the other. Turning his wrist half a degree, a person can move a laser from one side of the Moon to the other. It would appear that the laser dot is travelling faster than light, as flicking one's wrist at such a large distance would give the illusion that the object was able to cross the diameter of the Moon (6000 km, due to curvature) in milliseconds. Based on subsequent calculations (distance between points A and B divided by time it takes to move the laser from A to B), it would appear that the dot of light is moving at superluminal velocities, when, in reality, the dots are successive photons being emitted by the source moving across the face of the Moon.

== Resolution of the paradox in special relativity ==
The paradoxical aspect of each of the described thought experiments arises from Einstein’s theory of special relativity, which proclaims the speed of light (approx. 300,000 km/s) is the upper limit of speed in our universe. The uniformity of the speed of light is so absolute that regardless of the speed of the observer as well as the speed of the source of light the speed of the light ray should remain constant.

When considering the movement of an image created by a laser on the Moon, some physical limitations would have to be violated in order to trace out the apparent trajectory at superluminal velocities. To approach the speed of light, and therefore to pass it, an object would have to be accelerated through an infinite potential, an impossibility within the physical universe. The acceleration process would also cause the object to have infinite mass, which is not only logically impossible, but it would also cause severe gravitational effects in the surrounding spacetime. However, these effects that have no empirical evidence leading to the conclusion that there is a simple physical explanation.

The fundamental misunderstanding of this paradox is the assumption that the projected image caused by the light ray is a physical object, and therefore must follow physical law. In reality, no physical laws are being broken as there is no physical object travelling faster than light. This paradox uses kinematic processes to explain the motion of this apparent object. However, the projected image on the Moon, or the image created by the lighthouse, is not a real object. The apparent lateral motion across the surface of the Moon is a result of the light source moving through some angular rotation, not superluminal motion across its surface. The angular motion of the source creates a translation of the image projected on the Moon, proportional to the distance between the screen (which in this case is Moon) and the source. Thus, if one was to go close enough to the Moon and rotate the laser through the same angle the image would travel at subluminal speeds even though nothing that should effect its speed has changed. If the image was a physical object, it should be able to travel across the surface of the Moon at the same speed regardless of the distance of the observer. Understanding this, the paradox begins to unravel.

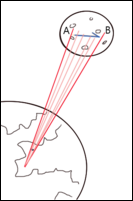
The movement from point A to point B can be visualized as a collection of photons, each travelling along a different trajectory from Earth to the Moon

It is natural to visualize this phenomenon as an abundance of stationary photons within the same ray of light creating the spot on the Moon. To allow the image to move from one end of the Moon to the other, each photon must move laterally with the movement of the projection. In reality, this is not the case: the ray of light is a collection of moving photons and at each instant a different group of photons, detected by the observers eye, are creating the image seen on the surface of the Moon. The apparent lateral movement is caused by new photons traveling on a different path from the light source to the Moon, caused by the rotation of the source, striking an adjacent position at all instances during the rotation. The movement from point A to point B can be visualized by a collection of photons, each travelling along a different trajectory from Earth to the Moon. The paradox is resolved to be a result of the geometry of the system causing the illusion of superluminal motion, rather than superluminal motion actually occurring.

A final issue with this explanation is that there appears to be no delay between the flicking of the wrist and the movement of the image on the Moon, a process that is expected if the photon resolution is correct. This does not invalidate the resolution of the paradox. The apparent simultaneity is a result of the large magnitude of the speed of light, and the observers inability to detect changes that fast. In ideal conditions, the expected delay would be noticeable.
