= MacDowell–Mansouri action =

Action used to derive Einstein's field equations

The MacDowell–Mansouri action (named after S. W. MacDowell and Freydoon Mansouri) is an action that is used to derive Einstein's field equations of general relativity.

It can usefully be formulated in terms of Cartan geometry.
