= Henri Bacry =

Henri Bacry (1928–2010) was Professor Emeritus at the Université de la Méditerranée. Henri Bacry was assistant of physics at the Faculté des Sciences d'Alger and then Professor of mathematics at Lycée Bugeaud, before becoming, in 1969, Professor at the Faculté des Sciences de Luminy. He was a visiting scholar at the Institute for Advanced Study in Princeton in 1966-6 and a researcher at CERN. He is the founder in 1972 of the International Colloquium of Group Theoretical Methods in Physics. He has numerous publications on theoretical physics, problems of symmetry in various fields ranging from relativity to particle physics, optics, physics of sound and statistical mechanics and some work in mathematics.

== Selected publications ==
- with Jean-Marc Lévy-Leblond Possible Kinematics, J. Math. Phys., vol. 9, 1969, pp. 1605–1614 doi:10.1063/1.1664490 (discussed by Freeman Dyson his 1972 Gibbs Lecture Missed opportunities)
- Constellations and projective classical groups, Comm. Math. Pays., vol. 72, 1980, pp. 119–130 doi:10.1007/BF01197631
- Group theory and constellations. Editions Publibook, 2004.
