= Giuseppe Arcidiacono =

Italian physicist

- Born: 1927; Acireale, Italy
- Died: 1998 (aged 70–71); Italy
- Education: University of Catania
- Known for: Projective relativity, Fantappiè-Arcidiacono theory
- Scientific career
- Fields: Theoretical physics, mathematics, cosmology
- Workplaces: University of Perugia
- Doctoral advisor: Luigi Fantappiè

Giuseppe Arcidiacono (1927–1998) was an Italian physicist, born in Acireale. He earned his degree in physics at the University of Catania in 1951.

Arcidiacono was mathematician Luigi Fantappiè's main disciple. Together they worked on what they called projective relativity at the Istituto Nazionale di Alta Matematica in Rome.

In 1958 Arcidiacono won a scholarship to the Istituto H. Poincaré in Paris. He won the mathematics prize from the Accademia Nazionale dei Lincei. From 1969 until his death in 1998 he was Professor of Mechanical Engineering at the University of Perugia.
