= Metameme =

Meme about a meme

In the field of memetics, a metameme (or meta-meme) is a meme about a meme. The concept of memes themselves has been called "the Metameme". Ideological tolerance and the rhetorical device of metaphor are metamemes. Tolerance is:

A meta-meme which confers resistance to a wide variety of memes (and their sociotypes), without conferring meme-allergies. In its purest form, Tolerance allows its host to be repeatedly exposed to rival memes, even intolerant rivals, without active infection or meme-allergic reaction. Tolerance is a central co-meme in a wide variety of schemes, particularly "liberalism", and "democracy". Without it, a scheme will often become exo-toxic and confer meme-allergies on its hosts. Since schemes compete for finite belief-space, tolerance is not necessarily a virtue, but it has co-evolved in the ideosphere in much the same way as co-operation has evolved in biological ecosystems. (Henson.)

Metamemes have recently attracted new attention, and the terminology around them has evolved significantly.

== Measuring social evolution ==
Metamemes may be used to measure the evolution of a given society. It has been proposed that the degree of consciousness a society has about the very memes that form it is correlated with how evolved that society is. The difficulties associated with measuring the "metamemetic content" of a given society, however, render that proposition impractical.

This can be viewed (to some extent) as a memetic approach to the American sociologist Gerhard Lenski's view that the more information a given society has, the more advanced it is.

== See also ==
- Memeplex, Memetics and memetic engineering — examples of concepts that are meta-memes
