= Virus of the Mind =

Virus of the Mind or mind virus may refer to a kind of meme.

Virus of the Mind may also refer to:

- Virus of the Mind (album), an album by Starkill
- "Viruses of the Mind", an essay by Richard Dawkins
- Virus of the Mind: The New Science of the Meme, a book by Richard Brodie (programmer)
- "Virus of the Mind", a song from Heather Nova's sixth album, South

== See also ==
- Woke mind virus, a term popularized by Elon Musk
