= Shifman =

Shifman (Hebrew: שיפמן; Russian: Ши́фман) can be both a middle name and surname. Notable people with the name include:

== Middle name ==
- Shifra Shifman Shmuelevitch (1931–2012), Israeli writer

== Surname ==
- Aryeh Leib Shifman, Belarusian-born rabbi
- Ilya Shifman, Soviet historian
- Limor Shifman, professor of communication at the Hebrew University of Jerusalem
- Mikhail Shifman, theoretical physicist at the University of Minnesota
- Sagiv Shifman (born 1971), Israeli neurogeneticist

== See also ==
- Shifman Mattress Company, American mattress maker company
