= Memetic warfare =

Propaganda warfare via Internet memes

Memetic warfare is a modern form of information and psychological warfare that involves the propagation of Internet memes on social media. While different, memetic warfare shares similarities with propaganda and misinformation tactics, becoming a more common tool used by government institutions and other groups to influence public opinion.

== History ==
The concept of memetics derives from the book "The Selfish Gene" (1976) by Richard Dawkins, being defined as a non-genetic means of transferring information from one individual to another.

Over time, the term "meme" became commonly understood as an image, text, video, or other transferable form of digital information, typically spread for the purpose of humor.

Memetics: A Growth Industry in US Military Operations was published in 2005 by Michael Prosser, now a Lieutenant Colonel in the Marine Corps. He proposed the creation of a 'Meme Warfare Center'.

In Evolutionary Psychology, Memes and the Origin of War (2006), Keith Henson defined memes as "replicating information patterns: ways to do things, learned elements of culture, beliefs, or ideas."

Memetic warfare has been seriously studied as an important concept with respect to information warfare by NATO's Strategic Communications Centre of Excellence. Jeff Giesea, writing in NATO's Stratcom COE Defense Strategic Communications journal, defines memetic warfare as "competition over narrative, ideas, and social control in a social-media battlefield. One might think of it as a subset of 'information operations' tailored to social media. Information operations involve the collection and dissemination of information to establish a competitive advantage over an opponent". According to Jacob Siegel, "Memes appear to function like the IEDs of information warfare. They are natural tools of an insurgency; great for blowing things up, but likely to sabotage the desired effects when handled by the larger actor in an asymmetric conflict."

The Taiwanese government and Audrey Tang, its Minister of Digital Affairs, announced their intention to install memetic engineering teams in government to respond to disinformation efforts using a “humor over rumor” approach. The stated purpose of this approach is primarily to counter Chinese political warfare efforts and domestic disinformation.

== Examples ==
=== Russian annexation of Crimea (2014) ===
Evidence of memetic warfare and other applications of cyber-attacks aiding Russia in their efforts to annex Crimea has been made apparent by reports of roughly 19 million dollars being spent to fund "troll farms" and bot accounts by the Russian government. This campaign intended to spread pro-Russian sentiment on social media platforms, particularly targeting the ethnically Russian populations living within Crimea. This event is widely considered to be Russia's proof of concept for modern information warfare and serves as a template for future instances of memetic warfare.

=== United States presidential election (2016) ===
Memetic warfare on the part of 4chan and r/The_Donald subreddit is widely credited with assisting Donald Trump in winning the election in an event they call 'The Great Meme War'. According to Ben Schreckinger, "a group of anonymous keyboard commandos conquered the internet for Donald Trump—and plans to deliver Europe to the far right."

In a 2018 study, a team that analyzed a 160M-image dataset discovered that the 4chan message board /pol/ and subreddit r/The_Donald were particularly effective at spreading memes. They found that /pol/ substantially influenced the meme ecosystem by posting a large number of memes, while r/The_Donald was the most efficient community in pushing memes to both fringe and mainstream web communities.

=== Russian invasion of Ukraine (2022) ===
Russian troll factories, like the Internet Research Agency (IRA) and the Social Design Agency, increased their efforts after the invasion, operating with the maskirovka (to mask) strategy, a strategy that relies on distorting information in order to manipulate public perception. In response, Ukrainian accounts have started using memes as a way to debunk the Russian narratives.

Ukrainian Twitter accounts like @Ukraine, @DefenceU, and @uamemes-forces would spread the truth about what was happening in Ukraine during the war using memes. It was effective in garnering public sympathy for Ukraine. Makhortykh and Sydorova say that pictures of kids are used to “evoke compassion from the potential audience by using sentimental images." People would additionally put Ukrainian flags in their bios in order to show support.

=== Death of Madeleine Albright (2022) ===
Following the death of former U.S. Secretary of State Madeleine Albright in March 2022, printed obituaries with grotesque and satirical content appeared on public buildings in Banja Luka (Republic of Srpska) and Arilje (Serbia), and were rapidly disseminated on social media and by Serbian news portals. The obituaries, which combined vernacular humour, religious and political symbolism, and collective grievances over the 1999 NATO bombing of Yugoslavia, functioned as a form of hybrid online–offline meme. A 2024 discourse-analysis study of the episode described it as a case of memetic propaganda used in culture wars and public diplomacy, demonstrating how thanatopolitical content (the political instrumentalisation of death) can be compressed into easily spreadable memes that reinforce national identity, collective victimhood, and anti‑Western sentiment. The study found that pro‑government media amplified the memetic obituaries, and that the accompanying online commentary frequently invoked civilian casualties of the 1999 NATO campaign and bombing, thereby transforming Albright’s death into a “memory actant” that reactivated shared trauma.

=== United States presidential election (2024) ===
Information warfare spread during the 2024 election, with Russia supporting Trump and Iran supporting Harris, using memes as one form of content to spread propaganda and misinformation. Similes during the election in the form of memes were also rampant on Twitter, with one meme claiming Kamala Harris's campaign was like "the erratic movement of a faulty shopping cart."

Memes made using generative AI were also used from both sides of the election to sway the votes, as either a form of support within their own side or as attacks on the opposing side.

China-linked networks, such as the Spamouflage operation (also known as Dragon bridge or Storm-1376), contributed to these efforts by disseminating AI-generated memes and visual content impersonating American voters, including depictions of urban decay, political chaos, and criticisms of candidates.

=== Iran war (2026) ===
The 2026 Iran war saw immense spreading of memes by government figures and agencies of Iran, Israel, and the United States on social media since the first day of the war. These memes in particular, were noted for their heavy use of AI-generated videos and images. Accounts of Israeli government agencies regularly posted videos targeted at Iran's leadership and videos of combat footage such as drone strikes combined with popular meme sounds. In return, social media accounts controlled by the Iranian state media posted AI-generated videos ridiculing US president Donald Trump.

== References within fiction ==
In fiction, the 2002 Role-playing game Transhuman Space presented the world of 2100 as having "memetics" as a key technology, and the 2004 expansion "Transhuman Space: Toxic Memes" gave examples of "memetic warfare agents".
