= Memeplex =

Group of memes often found in the same individual

The study of memes, units of cultural information, often involves the examination of meme complexes or memeplexes. Memeplexes, comparable to the gene complexes in biology, consist of a group of memes that are typically present in the same individual. This presence is due to the implementation of Universal Darwinism's theory, which postulates that memes can more effectively reproduce themselves when they collaborate or "team up".

Various manifestations of memeplexes can be observed in our everyday surroundings, and they usually have a profound impact on shaping individual and societal behaviors. Some of the most common examples include:

Belief systems and ideologies
This refers to a wide array of constructs such as religions, philosophies, political alignments, and overall worldviews. All of these systems are composed of multiple interrelated memes that collectively form a cohesive belief system.
Organizations and groups
Entities such as churches, businesses, political parties, and clubs also illustrate memeplexes. These groups often share a common set of principles, rules, or beliefs that are propagated among their members.
Behavioral patterns
These include various cultural practices and routines, such as musical practices, ceremonies, marriage rituals, festivities, hunting techniques, and sports.

Contrary to inherited gene complexes, memeplexes encounter less pressure to provide benefits to the individuals exhibiting them for their replication. This distinction is because memes and memeplexes propagate virally via horizontal transmission, making their survival not solely dependent on the success of their hosts.

For memes and memeplexes to successfully replicate, they do not necessarily have to be useful, accurate, or factual. As an example, the geocentric model was a widely accepted concept despite its inaccuracies and has since been largely supplanted by more scientifically sound theories.

Prominent figures like philosopher Daniel C. Dennett, evolutionary biologist Richard Dawkins, and consciousness researcher Susan Blackmore, the author of The Meme Machine, advocate for the field of memetics, the study of memes and memeplexes. These thinkers argue that memes and memeplexes have a substantial influence on our thoughts, beliefs, and behaviors, shaping our cultural evolution.

== See also ==
- Metameme
- The Selfish Gene
- The Meme Machine
- Darwin's Dangerous Idea
- The Beginning of Infinity
