= Aaron Lynch =

Aaron Lynch may refer to:

- Aaron Lynch (writer) (1957–2005), best known for his book Thought Contagion: How Belief Spreads Through Society
- Aaron Lynch (American football) (born 1993), American football outside linebacker
