= Cultural trait =

Single identifiable element within culture

A cultural trait is a single identifiable material or non-material element within a culture, and is conceivable as an object in itself.

Similar traits can be grouped together as components, or subsystems of culture; the terms sociofact and mentifact (or psychofact) were coined by biologist Julian Huxley as two of three subsystems of culture—the third being artifacts—to describe the way in which cultural traits take on a life of their own, spanning over generations.

In other words, cultural traits can be categorized into three interrelated components:

1. Artifacts — the objects, material items, and technologies created by a culture, or simply, things people make. They provide basic necessities, recreation, entertainment, and most of the things that make life easier for people. Examples include clothing, food, and shelter.
2. Sociofacts — interpersonal interactions and social structures; i.e., the structures and organizations of a culture that influence social behaviour. This includes families, governments, education systems, religious groups, etc.
3. Mentifact (or psychofact) — abstract concepts, or "things in the head;" i.e., the shared ideas, values, and beliefs of a culture. This can include religion, language, and ideas.

Moreover, sociofacts are considered by some to be mentifacts that have been shared through artifacts. This formulation has been related to memetics and the memetic concept of culture. These concepts have been useful to anthropologists in refining the definition of culture.

== Development ==
These concepts have been useful to anthropologists in refining the definition of culture, which Huxley views as contemplating artifacts, mentifacts, and sociofacts. For instance, Edward Tylor, the first academic anthropologist, included both artifacts and abstract concepts like kinship systems as elements of culture. Anthropologist Robert Aunger, however, explains that such an inclusive definition ends up encouraging poor anthropological practice because "it becomes difficult to distinguish what exactly is not part of culture." Aunger goes on to explain that, after the cognitive revolution in the social sciences in the 1960s, there is "considerable agreement" among anthropologists that a mentifactual analysis, one that assumes that culture consists of "things in the head" (i.e. mentifacts), is the most appropriate way to define the concept of culture.

=== Sociofact ===
The idea of the sociofact was developed extensively by David Bidney in his 1967 textbook Theoretical Anthropology, in which he used the term to refer to objects that consist of interactions between members of a social group. Bidney's 'sociofact' includes norms that "serve to regulate the conduct of the individual within society."

The concept has since been used by other philosophers and social scientists in their analyses of varying kinds of social groups. For instance, in a discussion of the semiotics of the tune 'Taps', semiotician of music Charles Boilès claims that although it is a single piece of music, it can be seen as three distinct musical sociofacts: as a "last call" signal in taverns frequented by soldiers; as an "end of day" signal on military bases; and hence, symbolically, as a component of military funerals. The claim has been made that sociofactual analysis can play a decisive role for the performance of, and collaboration within, organizations.

== See also ==
- Meme
- Cultural universal
