= Population (human biology) =

Set of people living in a particular area or interbreeding

A human population is the set of people living in a particular geographic area, increasing or decreasing in size over time, but in human biology, a human population may be defined more precisely as "a group of individuals who are more likely to mate among themselves than among others", which is influenced by a number of social and cultural factors. Thus, a larger geographic population can be considered as made of smaller breeding populations that coexist together, but in practice, a population is usually defined by a geographic area, which can be based on a settlement, or larger territories (a country, region, city, or the whole world).

Population genetics studies differences between populations and differences inside a population. 99.9% of the human genome remains the same across all human populations, but the other genes can be different. Populations tend to have different phenotypic traits based on their geographical location and so may carry varying gene pools, but physical traits are not often used to define a population. Aside from the term "population", humans can also be grouped as races and ethnic groups.

Demography is the statistical study of human populations. Additional criteria may be used to define a demographic population or subpopulation, such as sex and age, as in the female population over 60 years of age. Demographic statistics may involve the structure (like age and sex distribution), spatial distribution, and size of a population, or involve population dynamics (the change of the size and age of a population). However, demographers use the term "population" differently from biologists, even if there are some similarities between these definitions: biologists study the number of individuals in a particular area and its evolution over time under varying conditions, while demographers count individuals by some certain criteria at a given time in a specific region.

== Etymology ==
The word population evolved from the Latin word "populus", which means "people" and which was originally used in the context of citizens of a specific place. Initially, population was a verbal noun describing a process or a state (such as an increase of inhabitants), but this definition later became archaic. The first known usage of the term dates back to the 1500s. Francis Bacon is credited to be the first who used it in its modern sense.

== Background ==
In biology, one definition of "population" is about interbreeding individuals, and in genetics, a definition may be about a common gene pool. More specifically, in biology the term "population" usually describes members of a species that can interbreed with each other and are geographically isolated from the other populations of the same species.

== Definition ==
Since all humans belong to the same species (Homo sapiens), they are all able to interbreed. Nevertheless, they represent different populations, separated from each other geographically, though modern global migration and transportation reduces boundaries between populations.

A single geographic area does not have to contain only one human population. Multiple human populations can coexist on the same territory because mating between them could be limited by such factors as ethnicity, education level, social status, and religion. Although nations and populations may overlap, their boundaries can be different. In biological anthropology, the definition of "population" also considers the culture shared between individuals and the time period in which a population lived, since the shared culture influenced mating behavior.

Physical characteristics (like eye color) are not typically used by biologists to define a population, since grouping people by one physical trait does not make them similar in other traits. If this was the case, a single individual would be a member of numerous groups. Human races are not considered populations either, because races can include smaller populations and definitions of some of the races are originally based on physical characteristics. Although the opposite opinion exists, thinking of a race as being of a population subdivided into demes.

== Difference from other animals ==
There are three main factors that limit the size of a population in humans and other animals: available food sources, diseases and the environment. Humans differ from other animals in that they have cultural, social, and technological factors that influence reproduction and population growth. Among technological factors, medicine has improved overall health and lowered mortality rate.

== See also ==
- Community (ecology)
- Human ecology
