= Memetic engineering =

Term based on Richard Dawkins' theory of memes

Memetic engineering, also meme engineering, is a term developed by Leveious Rolando, John Sokol, and Gibron Burchett based on Richard Dawkins' theory of memes.

- The process of developing memes, through meme-splicing and memetic synthesis, with the intent of altering the behavior of others in society or humanity.
- The process of creating and developing theories or ideologies based on an analytical study of societies, cultures, their ways of thinking and the evolution of their minds.
- The process of modifying human beliefs, thought patterns, etc.

In contrast, gutation is a term developed by Erik Buitenhuis and is:

- The process of altering the behaviour of oneself, with the intent of developing new memes.

== Definition ==
According to the theory of Memes coined by Richard Dawkins, evolution depends not on the particular chemical basis of genetics, but only on the existence of a self-replicating unit of transmission—in the case of biological evolution, the gene. For Dawkins, the meme exemplified another self-replicating unit with potential significance in explaining human behavior and cultural evolution: the effect a meme has on society is based on the application of the meme after understanding the qualities essential to the meme. According to the theory, memetic engineering is, simply put, the analysis of an individual or individuals' behavior, the selection of specific memes and the distribution or propagation of those memes with the intent of altering the behavior of others. A memetic engineer doesn't particularly have to consciously make the decision to alter another individuals behavior. It can happen unconsciously when specific behavior is observed, transmitted and then replicated within the observer. Memes themselves are neither good nor bad. For example, "racism" is an ideology that is made up of several memes. When a meme is introduced, those concepts begin to take on their own process of evolution based on the person who adopts the ideology, internalizes it, and reintroduces it into society causing it to spread like a virus.

According to the above theory, typical memetic engineers include scientists, engineers, industrial designers, ad-men, artists, publicists, political activists, and religious missionaries.

Dawkins agrees that much of theology and other theoretical aspects of religion can be viewed as the careful, even worshipful, handling of extremely powerful memeplexes with very odd or difficult traits.

== Origins of memetic engineering ==
Memetic Engineering developed from diverse influences, including cutting-edge physics of consciousness and memetics research, chaos theory, semiotics, culture jamming, military information warfare, and the viral texts of iconoclasts William S. Burroughs, J. G. Ballard, and Genesis P-Orridge. It draws upon Third Culture sciences and conceptual worldviews for Social Engineering, Values Systems Alignment, and Culture Jamming purposes. An important example of macro-historical memetic engineering analysis explaining how domination, patriarchy, war and violence are culturally programmed is Riane Eisler's The Chalice and the Blade (San Francisco: Harper SanFrancisco, 1988), which outlines her Dominator and Partnership Culture thesis. The savvy memetic engineer is able to isolate, study, and subtly manipulate the underlying values systems, symbolic balance and primal atavisms that unconsciously influence the individual psyche and collective identity. A highly educated but susceptible intelligentsia, worldwide travel, and information vectors like the Internet, cable television, and tabloid media, means that hysterical epidemics and disinformation campaigns may become more common. This warfare will be conducted using aesthetics, symbols, and doctrines as camouflage that will ultimately influence our cultural meme pool. These contemporary life conditions (Historic Times; Geographic Place; Existential Problems; and Societal Circumstances) are explored in books like Carl Sagan's The Demon Haunted World: Science As a Candle in the Dark (New York: Ballantine Books, 1996), John Brockman's The Third Culture: Beyond the Scientific Revolution (New York: Touchstone Books, 1996), and Michael Shermer's Why People Believe Weird Things: Pseudo-science, Superstition, and Other Confusions of Our Time (New York: W.H. Freeman & Co, 1996). Fictional descriptions of memetic engineering include Isaac Asimov's seminal Foundation Trilogy (New York: Bantam Books, 1991), George Gurdjieff's artificial mythology Beelzebub's Tales to His Grandson (New York: Penguin USA, 1999); Neal Stephenson's novels Snow Crash (New York: Bantam Spectra, 1993) and The Diamond Age (New York: Bantam Spectra, 1996); and Robert W. Chambers' unearthly The King in Yellow (Buccaneer Books, 1996) tome, which influenced seminal horror author H. P. Lovecraft.

== Applied memetic engineering ==
Memetic engineering as a social science lends examples of itself in multiple areas and disciplines. It is currently being examined and researched by the US military as a means to counterinsurgency and combat terrorism as explained below in "From the Clash to the Confluence of Civilizations" by Thomas P.M. Barnett, an American military geostrategist, and Richard J. Pech's "Inhibiting Imitative Terrorism Through Memetic Engineering".

Other examples of applied memetic engineering are present but not exclusive to the marketing and advertising industries. The question is whether these individuals can be truly considered memetic engineers. Marketing and advertising professionals create memes on an ongoing basis; however, this alone doesn't necessarily qualify them as being memetic engineers. Few if any actually fall into this category. This is possibly due to a lack of understanding of the various memes that have taken root in their target audience minds. According to the definition, industrial designers, musicians, artists, athletes, and other entertainers would more likely better serve this definition. This is because of their ability to create products, phrases and ideas that disseminate the population triggering a response within the brain causing a cultural phenomena.

Game theory provides an empirical means of advancing the science of memetics. Memetic game theory, attempts to mathematically capture behavior in strategic situations; where an individual's success in making choices depends on the choices of others, based on past experiences, emotional behavior and learned behavior. It also offers a scientific approach to analyzing social interactions.

=== Examples ===
An example of an engineered meme is Godwin's law, a meme which propagates on mail-lists, and which its author professes to have initiated to reduce spam on those lists; one version is "When someone posts a metaphor about Nazis the thread is no longer useful."

Richard Pech discusses the concept of memetic engineering within the context of countering mind contagions associated with terrorism. School shootings, for example, may be explained as an attempt to demonstrate the ultimate form of rebellion against a system in which the perpetrators feel ostracised or isolated. Acts of violence might appeal to their egos and the means for achieving this is replicated via the shooting meme. To re-engineer such a meme and its ability to infest susceptible minds, all information concerning such violence must be portrayed in an unappealing manner. For example, no one wants to be associated with acts of cowardice. By strongly suggesting that such violence is cowardly and the work of disturbed minds, it has less appeal for replication. In this manner the shooting meme has been re-engineered by removing its attraction, and therefore removing its ability to replicate.

=== Taiwan ===
The Taiwanese government has installed memetic engineering teams in each government department which can respond within 60 minutes to disinformation efforts using a “humor over rumor” approach. These teams are used to counter Chinese political warfare efforts as well as domestic disinformation.

== See also ==
- Collective consciousness
- Diffusion of innovations
- Egregore
- Meme
- Memetics
- Memetic warfare
- Opinion leader
- Propaganda
- Self-replication
