= Culturgen =

Term used to denote a unit of culture

Culturgen (culture + -gen) is a term used to denote a theoretical 'unit' of culture or cultural evolution. More specifically, analogous to a gene, it is a cultural artifact or element of behaviour whose repetition or reproduction is transmissible from one generation to the next. It has largely been displaced by the similar term meme.

The term was coined in 1980 by two American scientists—the biomathematician Charles J. Lumsden and the sociobiologist E. O. Wilson—in a controversial attempt to analyse cultural evolution by using techniques borrowed from population genetics, to develop a comprehensive theory of how genes interact with cultural variation, and to infer a theory of the evolution of the human mind.

The fullest exposition of their theory appeared in their book Genes, Mind, and Culture: The Coevolutionary Process (1981), which expanded upon the agenda that Wilson had laid out in Sociobiology: The New Synthesis (1975) and On Human Nature (1978). In the book, the two assume that culturgens are stored in long-term memory, are readily observable in the external world, and are to be transmitted via socialization. Genes, Mind, and Culture received many highly negative reviews in the scientific press, however; it was re-issued in 2005 with a review of subsequent developments.

It also effectively means much the same as the older term cultural trait used by anthropologists, and offers similar difficulties of identification and definition. The term has declined in popularity; the slightly older term meme—coined by Richard Dawkins in his book The Selfish Gene (1976)—is now used in its stead, almost universally (even by Wilson in his later writings).
