= Meme pool =

A meme pool is the sum total of all memes (transmittable units of cultural ideas, practices, symbols) present in a given human population. The term is analogous to gene pool. The meme pool is in essence the matrix of the whole of the culture of a population. Because the memes of instruction of production of material culture are included, then the entire culture, including material culture and interactions between individuals is determined by information held within the meme pool. The state of a meme pool determines what sort of memes will be reproductive, and in this way it may be thought of as the meme-logical environment.

Examples of meme pools may include large Internet communities such as imageboards, online forums, and wikis. More tangibly, large shopping malls, schools, and other social institutions may be included in the definition of a meme pool.

The term was coined by Richard Dawkins in The Selfish Gene.
