= Richard Brodie (programmer) =

American computer programmer and author (born 1959)

- Nickname: Quiet Lion
- Born: November 10, 1959 (age 67); Newton, Massachusetts, U.S.

World Series of Poker
- Money finishes: 8

World Poker Tour
- Final table: None
- Money finishes: 6

Richard Reeves Brodie (born November 10, 1959) is an American computer programmer and author. He wrote the first version of Microsoft Word. After leaving Microsoft, he became a motivational speaker and authored two books.

== Biography ==
=== Early life ===
Brodie was born in Newton, Massachusetts, the elder son of Mary Ann Brodie and Richard Brodie, a child psychologist. He graduated from Newton South High School and entered Harvard College in the fall of 1977, concentrating in applied mathematics with an emphasis on computer science. He left Harvard after his sophomore year and moved to Palo Alto, CA to work for Xerox Corporation's Advanced Systems Division (ASD), where he met Charles Simonyi and helped develop the Bravo X word processor for the Alto computer. Simonyi became a mentor to Brodie at Xerox and took him along when he moved to Microsoft in 1981.

=== Microsoft ===
Simonyi hired Brodie in 1981 as Microsoft's 77th employee and a founding member of the Microsoft Application Division.

Brodie distinguished himself at Microsoft by creating the first version of Microsoft Word in less than seven months. In addition to primary authorship of Microsoft Word, he wrote Microsoft's first C compiler, the original version of Notepad, and Word for the IBM PC Jr.

Brodie's success as a programmer brought him to the attention of Bill Gates, who made Brodie his technical assistant in 1983. Brodie's primary accomplishment as Gates's assistant was the management of the Cashmere project, which was released as Word for Windows. During the Cashmere design, Brodie came up with the idea of the Combo box (a combination text box and drop-down menu widely used today), the Ribbon (a strip of buttons at the top of the screen used to display and change formatting), and the squiggly red underline that checks and flags spelling errors automatically.

Brodie left Microsoft after the company went public in 1986, but returned in 1991 as Chief Software Designer and Lead Developer of the Omega project, which was released as Microsoft Access in 1992. He left Microsoft again in 1994.

=== After leaving Microsoft ===
Between his stints at Microsoft, Brodie embarked on a self-improvement quest, taking numerous courses and participating in retreats, seeking an answer to "why money and success didn’t make me happy." He wrote about his experience in his first book, Getting Past OK: The Self-Help Book for People Who Don’t Need Help, first published in 1993. It became a regional bestseller and was republished by Warner Books. He followed it with Virus of the Mind (1995), which explored the new field of memetics from a practical point of view. Hay House bought the rights to both books and currently publishes them in many languages worldwide.

Brodie spoke about his books on The Oprah Winfrey Show and Phil Donahue.

=== Poker player ===
Apart from his careers as a programmer and author, Brodie has found creative ways to integrate his love of sports and games into his professional life. In 2003 he joined the professional poker circuit. He has finished in the money in five World Series of Poker events and six World Poker Tours. Until Black Friday, he played as a Full Tilt Poker pro under the screen name Quiet Lion. He appeared on NBC's game show Identity and played himself in the movie The Grand.

In 2023, Brodie bested 440 players on his way to winning the 32nd annual World Recreational Gambling Poker Tournament (WRGPT) after 221 days of play. His efforts earned him $0 and an immutable place in poker history.

Brodie currently resides in Kirkland, Washington.

== Writings ==
- Virus of the Mind: The New Science of the Meme, Hay House, 2004. ISBN 978-1-4019-2468-3
- Getting Past OK: The Self-Help Book for People Who Don't Need Help, Hay House, 2009. ISBN 978-1-4019-2697-7
