= Memetics =

Study of self-replicating units of culture

Memetics, or the study of memes, is an emerging discipline in cultural evolution, based on the idea that culture can be reduced to the study of cultural units, called memes: ideas, behaviors, beliefs, and expressions that spread from person to person in a culture through imitation. The term "meme" was coined by biologist Richard Dawkins in his 1976 book The Selfish Gene, to illustrate the principle that he later called "Universal Darwinism". All evolutionary processes depend on information being copied, varied, and selected, a process also known as variation with selective retention. The conveyor of the information being copied is known as the replicator, with the gene functioning as the replicator in biological evolution. Dawkins proposed that the same process drives cultural evolution, and he called this second replicator the "meme", citing examples such as musical tunes, catchphrases, fashions, and technologies. Like genes, memes are selfish replicators and have causal efficacy; in other words, their properties influence their chances of being copied and passed on. Some succeed because they are valuable or useful to their human hosts while others are more like viruses.

Just as genes can work together to form co-adapted gene complexes, so form groups of memes acting together co-adapted meme complexes or memeplexes. Memeplexes include (among many other things) languages, traditions, scientific theories, financial institutions, and religions. Dawkins famously referred to religions as "viruses of the mind".

Among proponents of memetics are psychologist Susan Blackmore, author of The Meme Machine, who argues that when our ancestors began imitating behaviours, they let loose a second replicator and co-evolved to become the "meme machines" that copy, vary, and select memes in culture. Philosopher Daniel Dennett develops memetics extensively, notably in his books Darwin's Dangerous Idea, and From Bacteria to Bach and Back. He describes the units of memes as "the smallest elements that replicate themselves with reliability and fecundity", and claims that "Human consciousness is itself a huge complex of memes." In The Beginning of Infinity, the physicist David Deutsch contrasts static societies that depend on anti-rational memes, which suppress innovation and creativity, with dynamic societies based on rational memes that encourage enlightenment values, scientific curiosity, and progress.

Criticisms of memetics include claims that memes do not exist, that the analogy with genes is false, that the units cannot be specified, that culture does not evolve through imitation, and that the sources of variation are intelligently designed rather than random. Critics of memetics include biologist Stephen Jay Gould who calls memetics a "meaningless metaphor". Philosopher Dan Sperber argues against memetics as a viable approach to cultural evolution because cultural items are not directly copied or imitated but are reproduced. Anthropologist Robert Boyd and biologist Peter Richerson work within the alternative, and more mainstream, field of cultural evolution theory and gene-culture coevolution. Dual inheritance theory has much in common with memetics but rejects the idea that memes are replicators. From this perspective, memetics is seen as just one of several approaches to cultural evolution and one that is generally considered less useful than the alternatives of gene-culture coevolution or dual inheritance theory. The main difference is that dual inheritance theory ultimately depends on biological advantage to genes, whereas memetics treats memes as a second replicator in its own right. Memetics also extends to the analysis of Internet culture, including Internet memes.

== History ==
In his book The Selfish Gene (1976), the evolutionary biologist Richard Dawkins used the term meme to describe a unit of human cultural transmission analogous to the gene, arguing that replication also happens in culture, albeit in a different sense. While cultural evolution itself is a much older topic, with a history that dates back at least as far as Darwin's era, Dawkins (1976) proposed that the meme is a unit of culture residing in the brain and is the mutating replicator in human cultural evolution. After Dawkins, many discussed this unit of culture as evolutionary "information" which replicates with rules analogous to Darwinian selection. A replicator is a pattern that can influence its surroundings – that is, it has causal agency – and can propagate. This proposal resulted in debate among anthropologists, sociologists, biologists, and scientists of other disciplines. Dawkins did not provide a comprehensive explanation of how replication of units of information in the brain controls human behaviour and culture, as the main focus of the book was on gene expression. Dawkins apparently did not intend to present a comprehensive theory of memetics in The Selfish Gene, but rather coined the term meme in a speculative spirit. Accordingly, different researchers came to define the term "unit of information" in different ways.

The evolutionary model of cultural information transfer is based on the concept that memes—units of information—have an independent existence, are self-replicating, and are subject to selective evolution through environmental forces. Starting from a proposition put forward in the writings of Dawkins, this model has formed the basis of a new area of study, one that looks at the self-replicating units of culture. It has been proposed that just as memes are analogous to genes, memetics is analogous to genetics.

The modern memetics movement dates from the mid-1980s. A January 1983 "Metamagical Themas" column by Douglas Hofstadter, in Scientific American, was influential – as was his 1985 book of the same name. "Memeticist" was coined as analogous to "geneticist" – originally in The Selfish Gene. Later Arel Lucas suggested that the discipline that studies memes and their connections to human and other carriers of them be known as "memetics" by analogy with "genetics". Dawkins' The Selfish Gene has been a factor in attracting the attention of people of disparate intellectual backgrounds. Another stimulus was the publication in 1991 of Consciousness Explained by Tufts University philosopher Daniel Dennett, which incorporated the meme concept into a theory of the mind. In his 1991 essay "Viruses of the Mind", Richard Dawkins used memetics to explain the phenomenon of religious belief and the various characteristics of organised religions. By then, memetics had also become a theme appearing in fiction (e.g. Neal Stephenson's Snow Crash).

The idea of language as a virus had already been introduced by William S. Burroughs as early as 1962 in his novel The Ticket That Exploded, and continued in The Electronic Revolution, published in 1970 in The Job.

The foundation of memetics in its full modern incarnation was launched by Douglas Rushkoff's Media Virus: Hidden Agendas in Popular Culture in 1995, and was accelerated with the publication in 1996 of two more books by authors outside the academic mainstream: Virus of the Mind: The New Science of the Meme by former Microsoft executive turned motivational speaker and professional poker-player Richard Brodie, and Thought Contagion: How Belief Spreads Through Society by Aaron Lynch, a mathematician and philosopher who worked for many years as an engineer at Fermilab. Lynch claimed to have conceived his theory totally independently of any contact with academics in the cultural evolutionary sphere, and apparently was not aware of The Selfish Gene until his book was very close to publication.

Around the same time as the publication of the books by Lynch and Brodie the e-journal Journal of Memetics – Evolutionary Models of Information Transmission (published electronically from 1997 to 2005) first appeared. It was first hosted by the Centre for Policy Modelling at Manchester Metropolitan University. The e-journal soon became the central point for publication and debate within the nascent memeticist community. (There had been a short-lived paper-based memetics publication starting in 1990, the Journal of Ideas edited by Elan Moritz.) In 1999, Susan Blackmore, a psychologist at the University of the West of England, published The Meme Machine, which more fully worked out the ideas of Dennett, Lynch, and Brodie and attempted to compare and contrast them with various approaches from the cultural evolutionary mainstream, as well as providing novel (and controversial) memetics-based theories for the evolution of language and the human sense of individual selfhood.

=== Etymology ===
The term meme derives from the Ancient Greek μιμητής (mimētḗs), meaning "imitator, pretender". The similar term mneme was used in 1904, by the German evolutionary biologist Richard Semon, best known for his development of the engram theory of memory, in his work Die mnemischen Empfindungen in ihren Beziehungen zu den Originalempfindungen, translated into English in 1921 as The Mneme. Until Daniel Schacter published Forgotten Ideas, Neglected Pioneers: Richard Semon and the Story of Memory in 2000, Semon's work had little influence, though it was quoted extensively in Erwin Schrödinger's 1956 Tarner Lecture "Mind and Matter". Richard Dawkins (1976) apparently coined the word meme independently of Semon, writing this:

"'Mimeme' comes from a suitable Greek root, but I want a monosyllable that sounds a bit like 'gene'. I hope my classicist friends will forgive me if I abbreviate mimeme to meme. If it is any consolation, it could alternatively be thought of as being related to 'memory', or to the French word même."

David Hull (2001) pointed out Dawkins's oversight of Semon's work. Hull suggests this early work as an alternative origin to memetics by which Dawkins's memetic theory and classicist connection to the concept can be negotiated.

"Why not date the beginnings of memetics (or mnemetics) as 1904 or at the very least 1914? If [Semon's] two publications are taken as the beginnings of memetics, then the development of memetics [...] has been around for almost a hundred years without much in the way of conceptual or empirical advance!"

Despite this, Semon's work remains mostly understood as distinct to memetic origins even with the overt similarities accounted for by Hull.

=== Internalists and externalists ===
The memetics movement split almost immediately into two. The first group were those who wanted to stick to Dawkins' definition of a meme as "a unit of cultural transmission". Gibron Burchett, a memeticist responsible for helping to research and co-coin the term memetic engineering, along with Leveious Rolando and Larry Lottman, has stated that a meme can be defined, more precisely, as "a unit of cultural information that can be copied, located in the brain". This thinking is more in line with Dawkins' second definition of the meme in his book The Extended Phenotype. The second group wants to redefine memes as observable cultural artifacts and behaviors. However, in contrast to those two positions, the article "Consciousness in meme machines" by Susan Blackmore rejects neither movement. Andrej Drapal tried to bridge the gap with his differentiation of memes as quantum entities existing per se in quantum superposition and collapsing when detected by brains from cultural artifacts. Memes are to artifacts as genotypes are to phenotypes.

These two schools became known as the "internalists" and the "externalists". Prominent internalists included both Lynch and Brodie; the most vocal externalists included Derek Gatherer, a geneticist from Liverpool John Moores University, and William Benzon, a writer on cultural evolution and music. The main rationale for externalism was that internal brain entities are not observable, and memetics cannot advance as a science, especially a quantitative science, unless it moves its emphasis onto the directly quantifiable aspects of culture. Internalists countered with various arguments: that brain states will eventually be directly observable with advanced technology, that most cultural anthropologists agree that culture is about beliefs and not artifacts, or that artifacts cannot be replicators in the same sense as mental entities (or DNA) are replicators. The debate became so heated that a 1998 Symposium on Memetics, organised as part of the 15th International Conference on Cybernetics, passed a motion calling for an end to definitional debates. McNamara demonstrated in 2011 that functional connectivity profiling using neuroimaging tools enables the observation of the processing of internal memes, "i-memes", in response to external "e-memes". This was developed further in a paper "Memetics and Neural Models of Conspiracy Theories" by Duch, where a model of memes as a quasi-stable neural associative memory attractor network is proposed, and a formation of Memeplex leading to conspiracy theories illustrated with the simulation of a self-organizing network.

An advanced statement of the internalist school came in 2002 with the publication of The Electric Meme, by Robert Aunger, an anthropologist from the University of Cambridge. Aunger also organised a conference in Cambridge in 1999, at which prominent sociologists and anthropologists were able to give their assessment of the progress made in memetics to that date. This resulted in the publication of Darwinizing Culture: The Status of Memetics as a Science, edited by Aunger and with a foreword by Dennett, in 2001.

=== Decline ===
In 2005, the Journal of Memetics ceased publication and published a set of articles on the future of memetics. The website states that although "there was to be a relaunch... after several years nothing has happened". Susan Blackmore left the University of the West of England to become a freelance science-writer and now concentrates more on the field of consciousness and cognitive science. Derek Gatherer moved to work as a computer programmer in the pharmaceutical industry, although he still occasionally publishes on memetics-related matters. Richard Brodie is now climbing the world professional poker rankings. Aaron Lynch disowned the memetics community and the words "meme" and "memetics" (without disowning the ideas in his book), adopting the self-description "thought contagionist". He died in 2005.

Susan Blackmore (2002) re-stated the definition of meme as: whatever is copied from one person to another person, whether habits, skills, songs, stories, or any other kind of information. Further she said that memes, like genes, are replicators in the sense as defined by Dawkins. That is, they are information that is copied. Memes are copied by imitation, teaching and other methods. The copies are not perfect: memes are copied with variation; moreover, they compete for space in our memories and for the chance to be copied again. Only some of the variants can survive. The combination of these three elements (copies; variation; competition for survival) forms precisely the condition for Darwinian evolution, and so memes (and hence human cultures) evolve. Large groups of memes that are copied and passed on together are called co-adapted meme complexes, or memeplexes. In Blackmore's definition, the way that a meme replicates is through imitation. This requires brain capacity to generally imitate a model or selectively imitate the model. Since the process of social learning varies from one person to another, the imitation process cannot be said to be completely imitated. The sameness of an idea may be expressed with different memes supporting it. This is to say that the mutation rate in memetic evolution is extremely high, and mutations are even possible within each and every iteration of the imitation process. It becomes very interesting when we see that a social system composed of a complex network of microinteractions exists, but at the macro level an order emerges to create culture.

Many researchers of cultural evolution regard memetic theory of this time a failed paradigm superseded by dual inheritance theory. Others instead suggest it is not superseded but rather holds a small but distinct intellectual space in cultural evolutionary theory.

=== "Internet Memetics" ===
A new framework of Internet Memetics initially borrowed Blackmore's conceptual developments but is effectively a data-driven approach, focusing on digital artifacts. This was led primarily by conceptual developments Colin Lankshear and Michele Knobel (2006) and Limor Shifman and Mike Thelwall (2009). Shifman, in particular, followed Susan Blackmore in rejecting the internalist and externalist debate, however did not offer a clear connection to prior evolutionary frameworks. Later in 2014, she rejected the historical relevance of "information" to memetics. Instead of memes being units of cultural information, she argued information is exclusively delegated to be "the ways in which addressers position themselves in relation to [a meme instance's] text, its linguistic codes, the addressees, and other potential speakers." This is what she called stance, which is analytically distinguished from the content and form of her meme. As such, Shifman's developments can be seen as critical to Dawkins's meme, but also as a somewhat distinct conceptualization of the meme as a communicative system dependent on the internet and social media platforms. By introducing memetics as an internet study there has been a rise in empirical research. That is, memetics in this conceptualization has been notably testable by the application of social science methodologies. It has been popular enough that following Lankshear and Knobel's (2019) review of empirical trends, they warn those interested in memetics that theoretical development should not be ignored, concluding that,

"[R]ight now would be a good time for anyone seriously interested in memes to revisit Dawkins' work in light of how internet memes have evolved over the past three decades and reflect on what most merits careful and conscientious research attention."

As Lankshear and Knobel show, the Internet Memetic reconceptualization is limited in addressing long-standing memetic theory concerns. It is not clear that existing Internet Memetic theory's departure from conceptual dichotomies between internalist and externalist debate are compatible with most earlier concerns of memetics. Internet Memetics might be understood as a study without an agreed upon theory, as present research tends to focus on empirical developments answering theories of other areas of cultural research. It exists more as a set of distributed studies than a methodology, theory, field, or discipline, with a few exceptions such as Shifman and those closely following her motivating framework.

== Criticisms ==
Critics contend that some of the proponents' assertions are "untested, unsupported or incorrect". Most of the history of memetic criticism has been directed at Dawkins' earlier theory of memetics framed in The Selfish Gene. There have been some serious criticisms of memetics. Namely, there are a few key points on which most criticisms focus: mentalism, cultural determinism, Darwinian reduction, a lack of academic novelty, and a lack of empirical evidence of memetic mechanisms.

Luis Benitez-Bribiesca points to the lack of memetic mechanisms. He refers to the lack of a code script for memes which would suggest a genuine analogy to DNA in genes. He also suggests the meme mutation mechanism is too unstable which would render the evolutionary process chaotic. That is to say that the "unit of information" which traverses across minds is perhaps too flexible in meaning to be a realistic unit. As such, he calls memetics "a pseudoscientific dogma" and "a dangerous idea that poses a threat to the serious study of consciousness and cultural evolution" among other things.

Another criticism points to memetic triviality. That is, some have argued memetics is derivative of more rich areas of study. One of these cases comes from Peircian semiotics, (e.g., Deacon, Kull) stating that the concept of meme is a less developed Sign. Meme is thus described in memetics as a sign without its triadic nature. Charles Sanders Peirce's semiotic theory involves a triadic structure: a sign (a reference to an object), an object (the thing being referred to), and an interpretant (the interpreting actor of a sign). For Deacon and Kull, the meme is a degenerate sign, which includes only its ability of being copied. Accordingly, in the broadest sense, the objects of copying are memes, whereas the objects of translation and interpretation are signs.

Others have pointed to the fact that memetics reduces genuine social and communicative activity to genetic arguments, and this cannot adequately describe cultural interactions between people. For example, Henry Jenkins, Joshua Green, and Sam Ford, in their book Spreadable Media (2013), criticize Dawkins' idea of the meme, writing that "while the idea of the meme is a compelling one, it may not adequately account for how content circulates through participatory culture." The three authors also criticize other interpretations of memetics, especially those which describe memes as "self-replicating", because they ignore the fact that "culture is a human product and replicates through human agency." In doing so, they align more closely with Shifman's notion of Internet Memetics and her addition of the human agency of stance to describe participatory structure.

Mary Midgley criticizes memetics for at least two reasons:

"One, culture is not best understood by examining its smallest parts, as culture is pattern-like, comparable to an ocean current. Many more factors, historical and others, should be taken into account than only whatever particle culture is built from. Two, if memes are not thoughts (and thus not cognitive phenomena), as Daniel C. Dennett insists in "Darwin's Dangerous Idea", then their ontological status is open to question, and memeticists (who are also reductionists) may be challenged whether memes even exist. Questions can extend to whether the idea of "meme" is itself a meme or is a true concept. Fundamentally, memetics is an attempt to produce knowledge through organic metaphors, which as such is a questionable research approach, as the application of metaphors has the effect of hiding that which does not fit within the realm of the metaphor. Rather than study actual reality, without preconceptions, memetics, as so many of the socio-biological explanations of society, believe that saying that the apple is like an orange is a valid analysis of the apple."

Like other critics, Maria Kronfeldner has criticized memetics for being based on an allegedly inaccurate analogy with the gene; alternately, she claims it is "heuristically trivial", being a mere redescription of what is already known without offering any useful novelty.

== New developments ==
=== Alternative definitions ===
- Dawkins, in A Devil's Chaplain, expanded his definition of meme by saying there are actually two different types of memetic processes (controversial and informative). The first is a type of cultural idea, action, or expression, which does have high variance; for instance, a student of his who had inherited some of the mannerisms of Wittgenstein. The second type is a self-correcting meme that is highly resistant to mutation. As an example of this, he gives origami patterns taught to elementary students– the meme is either passed on in the exact sequence of instructions, or (in the case of a forgetful child) terminates. The self-correcting meme tends to not evolve, and to experience profound mutations in the rare event that it does.
- Another definition, given by Hokky Situngkir, tried to offer a more rigorous formalism for the meme, memeplexes, and the deme, seeing the meme as a cultural unit in a cultural complex system. It is based on the Darwinian genetic algorithm with some modifications to account for the different patterns of evolution seen in genes and memes. In the method of memetics as the way to see culture as a complex adaptive system, he describes a way to see memetics as an alternative methodology of cultural evolution.
- DiCarlo (2010) developed the definition of meme further to include the idea of 'memetic equilibrium', which describe a culturally compatible state with biological equilibrium. In "How Problem Solving and Neurotransmission in the Upper Paleolithic led to The Emergence and Maintenance of Memetic Equilibrium in Contemporary World Religions", DiCarlo argues that as human consciousness evolved and developed, so too did our ancestors' capacity to consider and attempt to solve environmental problems in more conceptually sophisticated ways. When a satisfactory solution is found, the feeling of environmental stability, or memetic equilibrium, is achieved. The relationship between a gradually emerging conscious awareness and sophisticated languages in which to formulate representations combined with the desire to maintain biological equilibrium, generated the necessity for equilibrium to fill in conceptual gaps in terms of understanding three very important aspects in the Upper Paleolithic: causality, morality, and mortality. The desire to explain phenomena in relation to maintaining survival and reproductive stasis, generated a normative stance in the minds of our ancestors—Survival/Reproductive Value (or S-R Value).
- Limor Shifman (2014) defines Internet memes, memes in digitally mediated contexts, to be (a) a group of digital items sharing common characteristics of content, form, and/or stance, which (b) were created with awareness of each other, and (c) were circulated, imitated, and/or transformed via the Internet by many users. Further, she outlines content as "both ideas and ideologies", form as "the physical incarnation of the message", and stance as "the information memes convey about their own communication". Stance is about how actors (e.g. people) position themselves in relation to content and form of the media as well as those who might be addressed by the message.
- Over a decade after Kull's and Deacon's semiotic critique, Sara Cannizzaro offered her own development to redeem memes as fully formed cybersemiotic signs which has had limited success among those adjacent to Internet Memetics. In particular, she translates many of the neo-Darwinian conceptualizations of evolution to biosemiotic evolutionary concepts. This approach was theoretically integrated with an empirical investigation of information in Alexander O. Smith and Jeff Hemsley's development. They suggested under the influence of Cannizzaro's work that memes are "an information transmission network of documents connected through their differences among similarities and is interpreted as a semiotic system".

=== Memetic analysis ===
- The possibility of quantitative analysis of memes using neuroimaging tools and the suggestion that such studies have already been done was given by McNamara (2011). This author proposes hyperscanning (concurrent scanning of two communicating individuals in two separate MRI machines) as a key tool in the future for investigating memetics.
- Proponents of memetics as described in the Journal of Memetics (out of print since 2005) believe that 'memetics' has the potential to be an important and promising analysis of culture using the framework of evolutionary concepts.
- Keith Henson in Memetics and the Modular-Mind (Analog Aug. 1987) makes the case that memetics needs to incorporate evolutionary psychology to understand the psychological traits of a meme's host.
- The primary analytic approaches of internet memetics has been more in association with visual culture and communication methodologies. These researchers justify the existence of memes by way of culturally association, social networks or networked artifacts, most notably online image artifacts.

== Applications ==
Research methodologies that apply memetics go by many names: Viral marketing, cultural evolution, the history of ideas, social analytics, and more. Many of these applications do not make reference to the literature on memes directly but are built upon the evolutionary lens of idea propagation that treats semantic units of culture as self-replicating and mutating patterns of information that are assumed to be relevant for scientific study. For example, the field of public relations is filled with attempts to introduce new ideas and alter social discourse. One means of doing this is to design a meme and deploy it through various media channels. One historic example of applied memetics is the PR campaign conducted in 1991 as part of the build-up to the first Gulf War in the United States.

The application of memetics to a difficult complex social system problem, environmental sustainability, has recently been attempted at thwink.org Using meme types and memetic infection in several stock and flow simulation models, Jack Harich has demonstrated several interesting phenomena that are best, and perhaps only, explained by memes. One model, The Dueling Loops of the Political Powerplace, argues that the fundamental reason corruption is the norm in politics is due to an inherent structural advantage of one feedback loop pitted against another. Another model, The Memetic Evolution of Solutions to Difficult Problems, uses memes, the evolutionary algorithm, and the scientific method to show how complex solutions evolve over time and how that process can be improved. The insights gained from these models are being used to engineer memetic solution elements to the sustainability problem.

Another application of memetics in the sustainability space is the crowdfunded Climate Meme Project conducted by Joe Brewer and Balazs Laszlo Karafiath in the spring of 2013. This study was based on a collection of 1000 unique text-based expressions gathered from Twitter, Facebook, and structured interviews with climate activists. The major finding was that the global warming meme is not effective at spreading because it causes emotional duress in the minds of people who learn about it. Five central tensions were revealed in the discourse about [climate change], each of which represents a resonance point through which dialogue can be engaged. The tensions were Harmony/Disharmony (whether or not humans are part of the natural world), Survival/Extinction (envisioning the future as either apocalyptic collapse of civilization or total extinction of the human race), Cooperation/Conflict (regarding whether or not humanity can come together to solve global problems), Momentum/Hesitation (about whether or not we are making progress at the collective scale to address climate change), and Elitism/Heretic (a general sentiment that each side of the debate considers the experts of its opposition to be untrustworthy).

Ben Cullen, in his book Contagious Ideas, brought the idea of the meme into the discipline of archaeology. He coined the term "Cultural Virus Theory", and used it to try to anchor archaeological theory in a neo-Darwinian paradigm. Archaeological memetics could assist the application of the meme concept to material culture in particular.

Francis Heylighen of the Center Leo Apostel for Interdisciplinary Studies has postulated what he calls "memetic selection criteria". These criteria opened the way to a specialized field of applied memetics to find out if these selection criteria could stand the test of quantitative analyses. In 2003 Klaas Chielens carried out these tests in a master's thesis project on the testability of the selection criteria.

In Selfish Sounds and Linguistic Evolution, Austrian linguist Nikolaus Ritt has attempted to operationalise memetic concepts and use them for the explanation of long term sound changes and change conspiracies in early English. It is argued that a generalised Darwinian framework for handling cultural change can provide explanations where established, speaker centred approaches fail to do so. The book makes comparatively concrete suggestions about the possible material structure of memes, and provides two empirically rich case studies.

Australian academic S.J. Whitty has argued that project management is a memeplex with the language and stories of its practitioners at its core. This radical approach sees a project and its management as an illusion; a human construct about a collection of feelings, expectations, and sensations, which are created, fashioned, and labeled by the human brain. Whitty's approach requires project managers to consider that the reasons for using project management are not consciously driven to maximize profit, and are encouraged to consider project management as naturally occurring, self-serving, evolving process which shapes organizations for its own purpose.

Swedish political scientist Mikael Sandberg argues against "Lamarckian" interpretations of institutional and technological evolution and studies creative innovation of information technologies in governmental and private organizations in Sweden in the 1990s from a memetic perspective. Comparing the effects of active ("Lamarckian") IT strategy versus user–producer interactivity (Darwinian co-evolution), evidence from Swedish organizations shows that co-evolutionary interactivity is almost four times as strong a factor behind IT creativity as the "Lamarckian" IT strategy.

== Terminology ==
- Memeplex – (an abbreviation of meme-complex) is a collection or grouping of memes that have evolved into a mutually supportive or symbiotic relationship. Simply put, a meme-complex is a set of ideas that reinforce each other. Meme-complexes are roughly analogous to the symbiotic collection of individual genes that make up the genetic codes of biological organisms. An example of a memeplex would be a religion.
- Meme pool – a population of interbreeding memes.
- Memetic engineering – The process of deliberately creating memes, using engineering principles.
- Memetic algorithms – an approach to evolutionary computation that attempts to emulate cultural evolution in order to solve optimization problems.
- Memetic computing
- Memotype – the actual information-content of a meme.
- Memeoid – a neologism for people who have been taken over by a meme to the extent that their own survival becomes inconsequential. Examples include kamikazes, suicide bombers and cult members who commit mass suicide. The term was apparently coined by H. Keith Henson in "Memes, L5 and the Religion of the Space Colonies", L5 News, September 1985 pp. 5–8, and referenced in the expanded second edition of Richard Dawkins' book The Selfish Gene (p. 330). In The Electronic Revolution William S. Burroughs writes: "the word has not been recognised as a virus because it has achieved a state of stable symbiosis with the host."
- Memetic equilibrium – the cultural equivalent of species biological equilibrium. It is that which humans strive for in terms of personal value with respect to cultural artefacts and ideas. The term was coined by Christopher diCarlo.
- Metamemetic thinking - coined by Diego Fontanive, is the thinking skill & cognitive training capable of making individuals acknowledge illogical memes.
- Eumemics - the belief and practice of deliberately improving the quality of the meme pool.
- Memocide - intentional action to eradicate a meme or memeplex from the population, either by killing its carriers or by censorship.
- Memetic field is a concept proposed by Andrej Drapal, that should, in accordance with his thesis of strategic memes as quanta, replace concepts of memetic pools and memeplexes.

== In popular culture ==
Memetic phenomena are a prominent narrative device on the SCP Wiki collaborative writing project; anomalous memetic technology and hazards, as well as (more rarely) hostile memeplexes, are common elements of stories posted to the SCP Wiki. Of specific note is the novella There Is No Antimemetics Division by Sam Hughes, whose story entirely revolves around the idea of anomalous anti-memes - memes that hinder their own spread, often by erasing themselves.

== See also ==
- Baldwin effect – Effect of learned behavior on evolution
- Cultural evolution – Evolutionary theory of social change
- Cultural selection theory – Study of cultural change modelled on theories of evolutionary biology
- Dual inheritance theory – Theory of human behavior
- Egregore – Occult concept
- Evolutionary epistemology – Ambiguous term applied to several concepts
- Internet meme – Cultural item spread via the Internet
- Mentifact – Single identifiable element within culture
- Mimesis – Communication by means of imitation
- Seme (semantics) – Smallest unit of meaning
- Social constructionism – Sociological theory regarding shared understandings
- Social osmosis – Indirect infusion of knowledge
- Sociofact – Single identifiable element within culture
- Universal Darwinism – Application of Darwinian theory to other fields

== Sources ==
- Apter, Emily (2019). Alphabetic Memes: Caricature, Satire, and Political Literacy in the Age of Trump (PDF). OCTOBER Journal 170, Fall 2019, MIT Press Journal
- Botz-Bornstein, Thorsten (2008). "Can Memes Play Games? Memetics and the Problem of Space" in T. Botz-Bornstein (ed.): Culture, Nature, Memes: Dynamic Cognitive Theories (Newcastle: Cambridge Scholars Press), pp. 142–156.
- Boyd, Robert & Richerson, Peter J. (1985). Culture and the Evolutionary Process. University of Chicago Press. ISBN 978-0-226-06933-3
- Boyd, Rob & Richerson, Peter J. (2005). Not by Genes Alone: How Culture Transformed Human Evolution. Chicago University Press. ISBN 0-226-71284-2
- Boyles, Robert James M. (2011), "The Enemy: A Thought Experiment on Patriarchies, Feminisms and Memes" (PDF), Feminista: Gender, Race, and Class in the Philippines, Philippines: Anvil Publishing, Inc., pp. 53–64, ISBN 978-971-27-2594-4, archived (PDF) from the original on 2021-08-23
- DiCarlo, Christopher W. 2010. "How Problem Solving and Neurotransmission in the Upper Paleolithic led to The Emergence and Maintenance of Memetic Equilibrium in Contemporary World Religions". Politics and Culture.
- Cloak, F.T. (1975). "Is a cultural ethology possible?". Human Ecology. 3 (3): 161–182. Bibcode:1975HumEc...3..161C. doi:10.1007/bf01531639. S2CID 144333714.
- Edmonds, Bruce. 2002. "Three challenges for the survival of memetics". Journal of Memetics - Evolutionary Models of Information Transmission, 6.
- Edmonds, Bruce. 2005. "The revealed poverty of the gene-meme analogy – why memetics per se has failed to produce substantive results". Journal of Memetics - Evolutionary Models of Information Transmission, 9.
- Heylighen F. & Chielens K. (2009): Evolution of Culture, Memetics, in: Encyclopedia of Complexity and Systems Science, ed. B. Meyers (Springer)
- Houben, Jan E.M. "Memetics of Vedic Ritual, Morphology of the Agnistoma". Powerpoint presentation first presented at the Third International Vedic Workshop, Leiden 2002
- Houben, Jan E.M. "A Tradição Sânscrita entre Memética Védica e Cultura Literária". (In Portuguese) Revista Linguagem & Ensino, vol. 17 n. 2 (2014), p. 441-469.
- The Selfish Gene by Richard Dawkins, Oxford University Press, 1976, 2nd edition, December 1989, hardcover, 352 pages, ISBN 0-19-217773-7; April 1992, ISBN 0-19-857519-X; trade paperback, September 1990, 352 pages, ISBN 0-19-286092-5
- Aunger, Robert. The Electric Meme: A New Theory of How We Think. New York: Free Press, 2002. ISBN 978-0-7432-0150-6
- The Meme Machine by Susan Blackmore, Oxford University Press, 1999, hardcover ISBN 0-19-850365-2, trade paperback ISBN 0-9658817-8-4, May 2000, ISBN 0-19-286212-X
- The Ideology of Cybernetic Totalist Intellectuals an essay by Jaron Lanier which is very strongly critical of "meme totalists" who assert memes over bodies.
- Culture as Complex Adaptive System by Hokky Situngkir – formal interplays between memetics and cultural analysis.
- Journal of Memetics – Evolutionary Models of Information Transmission
- Brodie, Richard. Virus of the Mind: The New Science of the Meme. Seattle, Wash: Integral Press, 1996. ISBN 978-0-9636001-1-0
- Cultural Software: A Theory of Ideology by Jack Balkin which uses memetics to explain the growth and spread of ideology.
- Can we Measure Memes? by Adam McNamara which presents neuroimaging tools to measure memes.
