= Aaron Lynch (writer) =

American writer (1957–2005)

Aaron Lynch (February 18, 1957 – November 14, 2005) was an American writer, best known for his book Thought Contagion: How Belief Spreads Through Society.

== Biography ==
After obtaining bachelor's degrees in mathematics and philosophy from the University of Illinois, Lynch accepted a position in 1979 as an engineering physicist at Fermilab where he spent some time working on the PDP-11 hardware project. In his spare time, he worked on developing his thesis into a book, which he planned to title Abstract Evolution.

Lynch worked extensively on the theoretical underpinnings of idea self-replication, developing a symbolic language and deriving mathematics from epidemiologic formulae to describe idea transmission through populations. While conducting a literature search for his book, Lynch discovered the work of anthropologist F.T. Cloak on socially transmitted technology in birds, and a brief proposal for a field of Memetics in Richard Dawkins' book, The Selfish Gene, although Lynch was not aware of these authors' work until after his own theory was substantially developed. Early chapters of his book came to the attention of Douglas Hofstadter, who featured it in his Scientific American column Metamagical Themas in 1983. The first draft of the book was complete as early as 1984. A grant from a former colleague who had become a video-technology millionaire enabled Lynch to leave Fermilab in 1990 and concentrate full-time on writing.

In the early 1990s, he contributed theoretical and mathematical models on idea transmission to the Journal of Ideas, the first scholarly journal dedicated to memetics.

Lynch's book, after considerable revision, was eventually published in 1996 as Thought Contagion: How Belief Spreads Through Society.

In 1998, Lynch's "Units, Events and Dynamics in Memetic Evolution" provided much of the scholarly theoretical work omitted from "Thought Contagion". The paper detailed precise conceptual definitions of memetic terms, symbolic language to model idea replication, and mathematics to model population level idea transmission summarizing a decade of his conceptual work.

In August 2004, Lynch appeared to accuse Fast Company magazine and Seth Godin of plagiarism, claiming his complaint was backed, or even encouraged, by an unnamed 'major writers organization'.

Aaron Lynch died on November 14, 2005, at the age of 47, from anoxic encephalopathy after taking an overdose of an opiate-based pain killer, described as an accident in the Cook County, Illinois Coroner's Report. His remains are buried in Homewood Gardens in Homewood, Illinois.

== Outline of Lynch's theory ==
Lynch first developed the themes of Thought Contagion in his 1979 undergraduate senior thesis entitled "Abstract Evolution." The thesis explored the notion that an idea which can influence human behavior may blindly evolve the capacity to influence its own prevalence in the human population by motivating its human hosts to engage in behavior that spreads the idea. Just as a virus which elicits sneezes from its human host is more likely to survive by passing from host to host than a similar but non-sneeze-provoking virus, Lynch hypothesized that an idea which stimulated its host to proselytize, e.g., "Go and make disciples of all nations" (Gospel of Matthew 28:19), would be more likely to survive and become popular than an idea which did not elicit such activity. He identified other mechanisms which might also increase an idea's market share and longevity, such as influencing the human host to produce more children than it otherwise would, to instruct one's children in the belief earlier and more rigorously than one otherwise might, to isolate or effectively immunize oneself or one's children from exposure to competing ideas, to actively impede the communications of nonbelievers, or to utilize mass communications media to spread the idea to people that the host would never personally meet.

Cultural anthropology had long held that cultural beliefs and information—i.e., socially propagated ideas—survive and propagate because of the survival value they provide to the human groups that adopt them. Lynch embraced this notion of host-benefiting idea propagation, but his analysis added to this the notion that ideas could also propagate at the expense of their human hosts. He noted, for example, that beliefs which induced their hosts into self-sacrifice before sufficiently large audiences (e.g. earlier Christians refusing to worship the Emperor and dying serenely in Roman arenas or Islamist suicide bombers taping farewell videos for posthumous broadcast to worldwide audiences) could survive or even multiply just by capturing one or more hosts to replace the one it sacrificed.

Lynch questions whether ideas might be "shopping" for humans as well as vice versa, and asked whether humans own their most cherished beliefs or the beliefs own them. However, Lynch stopped short of suggesting that ideas have consciousness, will or planning abilities. To Lynch, ideas were information encoded in human neurons or other media. Like computer viruses, they are the products of human thinking and are in no way aware of or deliberating controlling their self-replicating abilities. However, unlike computer viruses, ideas often evolve new or improved contagious properties without intentional human design, through copying infidelity mutations or recombination into powerful new belief sets. According to Lynch, Natural selection determines which ideas survive and propagate successfully through human populations and which lose market share to the point of extinction.

Lynch's thesis offered an explanation for how not only true and useful ideas, but also unprovable or even false notions with sufficiently "contagious" properties could, over generations, become the predominant beliefs of whole societies. While he insisted that the contagiousness of ideas was largely independent of their truth value, as he immersed himself in this analysis, his frequently uttered motto became, "People don't learn from each other's mistakes. They learn each other's mistakes."

== Reception and criticism ==
Lynch's work encountered mixed reception among academics and among other memeticists. Some typical criticisms include the following:

1. Lynch's work is theoretical, as yet unproven by empirical or computer simulation research.
2. Lynch cites few of the works within the historic literature of social science which foreshadow a theory of social contagion.
3. Some memeticists dispute his definition of the meme (see memetics article).

Lynch addressed such criticism in the Journal of Artificial Societies and Social Simulation,

== Published works ==
- Lynch A. 1991. Thought contagion as abstract evolution. Journal of Ideas 2: 3–10.
- Lynch A. 1996. Thought contagion. How Belief Spreads Through Society. The New Science of Memes. Basic Books.
- Lynch, A. 1997 "Thought Contagion and Mass Belief". published in German as "Gedankeninfektion Wie berzeugungen Menschen Finden" gdi-impuls #3, September, 1997, pp. 42–54.
- Lynch, A., 1998; Units, Events and Dynamics in Memetic Evolution. Journal of Memetics - Evolutionary Models of Information Transmission, Volume 2. Units, Events and Dynamics in Memetic Evolution
- Lynch, A., 1999. "Memes and Mass Delusion": A lecture presented to the Philadelphia Association for Critical Thinking.
- Lynch, A. 1999. "The Millennium Thought Contagion." Skeptical Inquirer 23: (6), pp. 32–36.
- Lynch, A., 2000, Thought Contagions in the Stock Market. Journal of Psychology and Financial Markets 1: 1, p. 10-23
- Lynch, A., 2001, "Evolutionary contagion in mental software," in "The evolution of intelligence," edited by Robert J. Sternberg, James C. Kaufman. Publishers: Mahwah, N.J. : L. Erlbaum Associates.
- Lynch, A., 2001, "Thought contagion in the stock markets: A general framework and focus on the Internet bubble," in Derivatives Use, Trading and Regulation 6:4, p. 338-362.
- Lynch, A., 2002, "Thought Contagions in Deflating and Inflating Phases of the Bubble" Journal of Psychology and Financial Markets volume 3, number 2, pages 112–117.
- Lynch, A., 2002, "Thought Contagion in the Dynamics of Mass Conflict" Swedish Defence Research Agency publication.
- Lynch, A., 2003, "An Introduction to evolutionary epidemiology of ideas" The Biological Physicist. Vol. 3. No.2, pages 7–13.
