= Viruses of the Mind =

1991 essay by Richard Dawkins

"Viruses of the Mind" is an essay by British evolutionary biologist Richard Dawkins, first published in the book Dennett and His Critics: Demystifying Mind (1993). Dawkins originally wrote the essay in 1991 and delivered it as a Voltaire Lecture on 6 November 1992 at the Conway Hall Humanist Centre. The essay discusses how religion can be viewed as a meme - an idea which Dawkins had previously expressed in The Selfish Gene (1976). Dawkins analyzes the propagation of religious ideas and behaviors as a memetic virus, analogous to how biological and computer viruses spread. The essay was later published in A Devil's Chaplain (2003), and its ideas are further explored in Dawkins's documentary television programme The Root of All Evil? (2006).

== Content ==
Dawkins lists possible "symptoms" of infection with a "mind-virus" such as religion, providing examples for most of them, and tries to define a connection between the elements of religion and the religion's survival value (invoking Zahavi's handicap principle of sexual selection, applied to believers of a religion). Dawkins also describes religious beliefs as "mind parasites", and as "gangs [that] will come to constitute a package, which may be sufficiently stable to deserve a collective name such as Roman Catholicism ... or ... component parts to a single virus".

Dawkins suggests that religious belief in the "faith-sufferer" typically shows the following elements:

- It is impelled by some deep, inner conviction that something is true, or right, or virtuous: a conviction that doesn't seem to owe anything to evidence or reason, but which, nevertheless, the believer feels as totally compelling and convincing.
- The believer typically makes a positive virtue of faith's being strong and unshakable, despite it not being based upon evidence.
- There is a conviction that "mystery", per se, is a good thing; the belief that it is not a virtue to solve mysteries but to enjoy them and revel in their insolubility.
- There may be intolerant behaviour towards perceived rival faiths, in extreme cases even the killing of opponents or advocating of their deaths. Believers may be similarly violent in disposition towards apostates or heretics, even if those espouse only a slightly different version of the faith.
- The particular convictions that the believer holds, while having nothing to do with evidence, are likely to resemble those of the believer's parents.
- If the believer is one of the rare exceptions who follows a different religion from his parents, the explanation may be cultural transmission from a charismatic individual.
- The internal sensations of the 'faith-sufferer' may be reminiscent of those more ordinarily associated with sexual love.

Dawkins stresses his claim that religious beliefs do not spread as a result of evidence in their support, but typically by cultural transmission, in most cases from parents or from charismatic individuals. He refers to this as involving "epidemiology, not evidence". Further Dawkins distinguishes this process from the spread of scientific ideas, which, he suggests, is constrained by the requirement to conform with certain virtues of standard methodology: "testability, evidential support, precision, quantifiability, consistency, intersubjectivity, repeatability, universality, progressiveness, independence of cultural milieu, and so on". He points out that faith "spreads despite a total lack of every single one of these virtues".

== Critical reactions ==
Alister McGrath, a Christian theologian, has commented critically on Dawkins' analysis, suggesting that "memes have no place in serious scientific reflection", that there is strong evidence that such ideas are not spread by random processes, but by deliberate intentional actions, that "evolution" of ideas is more Lamarckian than Darwinian, and suggests there is no evidence that epidemiological models usefully explain the spread of religious ideas. McGrath also cites a meta-review of 100 studies and argues that "If religion is reported as having a positive effect on human well-being by 79% of recent studies in the field, how can it conceivably be regarded as analogous to a virus?"

== See also ==
- The God Delusion, wherein Dawkins characterizes religion as a delusional belief
- Speciesism § "Discontinuous mind"
- The concept of language as a virus in The Electronic Revolution by William S. Burroughs
