= The Meme Machine =

1999 science book by Susan Blackmore

- Author: Susan Blackmore
- Subject: Memetics
- Publisher: Oxford University Press
- Publication date: 8 April 1999
- Media type: Print
- Pages: 288
- ISBN: 0-19-286212-X
- OCLC: 52855410

The Meme Machine is a popular science book by Susan Blackmore on the subject of memes. Blackmore attempts to constitute memetics as a science by discussing its empirical and analytic potential, as well as some important problems with memetics. The first half of the book tries to create greater clarity about the definition of the meme as she sees it. The last half of the book consists of a number of possible memetic explanations for such different problems as the origin of language, the origin of the human brain, sexual phenomena, the Internet and the notion of the self. These explanations, in her view, give simpler and clearer explanations than trying to create genetic explanations in these fields.

The idea of memes, and the word itself, were originally speculated by Richard Dawkins in his book The Selfish Gene although similar, or analogous, concepts had been in currency for a while before its publishing. Richard Dawkins wrote a foreword to The Meme Machine.

In the book, Blackmore examines the difficulties associated with the meme including its definition and how to spot one as well as the difficulties which arise from seeing it as being like the gene. She sees the meme in terms of being a universal replicator, of which the gene is but an example, rather than being like the gene itself. Universal replicators possess three key characteristics: high fidelity replication, high levels of fecundity (and therefore many copies) and longevity. She believes that while memes have attained/evolved a sufficiently high level of these characteristics to qualify as replicators, they are not as effective replicators as genes, based on these key characteristics.

While others have accepted the possible existence of memes, they are sometimes seen as subordinate to genes. The author suggests that this is not the case now and that memes are independent replicators. Indeed, she suggests that memes may now in some cases be driving genetic evolution and be the cause of the abnormally large brain in Homo sapiens. Blackmore notes that human brains began expanding in size at about the same time that we started using tools and suggests that once individuals began to imitate each other, selection pressure favored those who could make good choices on what to imitate, and could imitate intelligently.

== Terminology ==
In the book, Blackmore tries to create a consistent vocabulary, since memetics has had a wide range of different terminologies and therefore, in Blackmore's opinion, many misleading concepts. Some of the terms that are central in her book include:

- Copy-the-product: e.g. make a copy of the soup. This is more prone to error since it requires an analytic capability of the soup itself and then a synthetic ability to combine the recognised elements. Any inserted errors will be passed on in the event of this copy of a soup being copied.
- Copy-the-instructions: e.g. make a copy of the soup recipe. This is less error prone since the important elements of the soup are already identified and the synthetic method explained. Any errors in using the recipe will not be passed on to future copiers since they will receive the recipe itself.
- Meme Fear: The idea that we are vessels for memes unacceptably undermines the popular understanding of free will and autonomy.
- Memeplex: Memes that are replicated together, such as religions and cultures.
- Memetic Theory of Altruism: She proposes that meme theory explains altruism better than genetics. That other things being equal, more people will observe altruistic behavior than selfish behavior, will like the altruistic person better than the selfish one, and will be more likely to adopt the behaviors of the altruistic person than the selfish one.

== Reception ==
Writing for The New York Times, Robert Wright gave his insight regarding the book, commenting that "her enthusiasm for memes gets the better of her", leading to Blackmore disregarding aspects of evolutionary fitness and biology. He criticizes her for neglecting previous research in anthropology and biology, while praising her for giving good insights into modern life and culture.
