= Pebbling =

Social behaviour

Pebbling is the act of offering small, meaningful objects or gestures to establish social bonds, observed in both animal behavior and human relationships. Pebbling promotes human bonding through homophily. The action gained popularity as a concept on social media in 2024, highlighting its role in emotional connection and communication.

The term pebbling originates from Adélie and Gentoo penguins, which present smooth pebbles used for nest-building to their partner as part of their courtship display.

== Background and context ==
The term pebbling gained popularity on social media in mid-2024 due to its association with the practice of sending memes, drawing a connection to the pebbling behavior of humans. The use of pebbles in human culture predates the 21st century. In Ancient Greece, pebbles were used to vote in elections, while Native Americans have historically used stones as mediation tools during meetings. Additionally, the Japanese practice of suiseki appreciated stones for their beauty.

== Pebbling in animals ==
Adélie and Gentoo penguins are species of penguins that present smooth pebbles used for nest-building to their partner as part of their courtship display. Male Gentoo penguins, who mate for life, will present a female with a stone. If a female is impressed, she too will find a stone, and they will go back and forth collecting the perfect rock collection until a nest is built. This ritual strengthens their bond and ensures both partners are invested in protecting their future offspring.

Like the Gentoo penguins, Adélie penguins live on icy ground when they are on land. They use the pebbles to line a small depression in the ground, where the stones can keep the eggs dry by allowing snow and water to flow around them.

Both species engage in the act of pebbling to prove their loyalty and interest in each other. For example, Adélie penguins, which spend a lot of time in the water, bring pebbles to their mate when they are about to enter the ocean to show that they will return. This gesture reinforces their connection and provides reassurance in their partnership.

== Pebbling in humans ==
Pebbling has been metaphorically applied to the human behavior of sending partners, friends, and family members, small gifts, or performing small deeds to let them know the sender is thinking of them to build social connection. Pebbling is an accessible, efficient, and inclusive low-risk form of communication that can provide a validating and comforting emotional impact.

Examples of physical pebbling include sending postcards, handwritten notes, picking flowers, or purchasing trinkets. Digital pebbling includes sending memes, videos, tweets, and TikToks. A stoppage in pebbling could be interpreted as ghosting.

Any small gesture can be considered pebbling if it contains personal meaning. The item or action may reflect the recipient's interest, sense of humor, knowledge, or an aspect of their relationship with the sender. This act reinforces a sense of being thought of, even in the absence of direct interaction. There are no strict limitations on how often someone can engage in pebbling. However, excessive pebbling can be overwhelming, a lack of it may indicate disinterest, and a sudden stoppage could be interpreted as ghosting. Frequent pebbling can establish an expectation of continuous gestures, and an abrupt stop could make someone feel ignored.

== Intergenerational and cross-relationship pebbling ==
Pebbling is not limited to romantic relationships but occurs across different age groups and social connections. Children gift handmade crafts to their teachers, friends, and family, while parents may buy or collect small trinkets for their loved ones. Small gestures also occur at the workplace, the gym, and school. Any exchange of meaningful objects, words of encouragement, or act of kindness is a form of pebbling to maintain social bonds. Pebbling is a universal form of connection that extends beyond romantic or digital interactions.

== Within the neurodivergent community ==
As a form of nonverbal communication, pebbling gestures can be used by neurodivergent people, who may not prefer traditional forms of affection. It is considered one of the five neurodivergent love languages, the others being: infodumping, parallel play, support swapping, and deep pressure. These love languages were identified to acknowledge the diverse ways in which neurodivergent individuals experience and communicate emotions.

Pebbling provides a means for neurodivergent individuals to express and receive affection without relying on physical touch or verbal communication. It facilitates meaningful connections both within the neurodivergent community and across broader social groups, as the practice of pebbling is widely practiced across cultures.
