= Sagiv Shifman =

Israeli researcher

- שגיב שיפמן
- Born: August 2, 1971 (age 55)
- Education: The Hebrew University of Jerusalem
- Scientific career
- Workplaces: The Hebrew University of Jerusalem
- Website: https://neurogenetics.huji.ac.il/

Sagiv Shifman (Hebrew: שגיב שיפמן; born August 2, 1971) is an Israeli scientist, professor in the field of neurogenetics at the Alexander Silberman Institute of Life Sciences, The Hebrew University of Jerusalem. He holds the Arnold and Bess Zeldich Ungerman chair in Neurobiology.

== Biography ==
Sagiv Shifman was born in Jerusalem in 1971 to Rachel and Pinhas Shifman. He completed all his degrees at The Hebrew University of Jerusalem. His doctorate was under the guidance of Ariel Darvasi in the genetics of complex traits, focusing on the genetic mapping of schizophrenia. In 2004 he started post-doctoral studies at the University of Oxford, in Jonathan Flint's laboratory, where he worked on genetic mapping in mice and genetics of neuroticism in humans. In 2008 he returned to Israel and founded the Neurogenetics Research Laboratory at the Department of Genetics, the Alexander Silberman Institute of Life Sciences, The Hebrew University of Jerusalem. In 2015 he was a visiting professor at the University of California at Los Angeles (UCLA) for about a year.

In 2013, he won the Krill Prize from the Wolf Foundation for excellence in scientific research.

Between 2017 and 2021, he served as the head of the genetics teaching program at the Hebrew University, and then as the head of the department.

Sagiv is married to Limor Shifman, father of two, and lives in Jerusalem.

== Research ==
Shifman's main research area is the genetics of neurodevelopmental and psychiatric disorders. His research focuses on genetic, molecular, and neurobiological mechanisms that lead to these disorders. His laboratory studies genetic variations in the human genome that affect gene function or regulation and investigates the relationship between genomics and neurodevelopmental disorders, focusing mainly on autism spectrum disorders.

His studies span over several fields and can be divided into three main topics:

• Genetic mapping of psychiatric diseases - Shifman's early works dealt with creating genetic maps in humans and mice and identifying genes related to schizophrenia and neuroticism.

• Biological mechanisms related to the autism spectrum - Shifman's laboratory pioneered the development of approaches to studying genes related to autism through the analysis of gene networks and their expression pattern in the human brain. Using these methods, they were able to show for the first time that genes related to autism are involved in the control of transcription, many of them are chromatin regulators, and that these genes are active during early brain development. In a series of articles, they studied the mechanism of autism-related chromatin regulators using a cellular, mouse, and fly models.

• Essential genes in mice and humans - to study genes sensitive to mutations, Shifman's laboratory conducted a CRISPR genetic screen for essential genes in mouse embryonic stem cells. In this study, they report the most comprehensive and systematic analysis of essential genes in the mouse genome, greatly expanding the understanding of essential genes for embryonic stem cells. This work shows that many of the genes associated with neurodevelopmental disorders are already essential at very early embryonic stages. In other studies, they identify the mechanisms that cause genes to be essential in human cancer cells originating from specific tissues. They also identify genes that are affected by the sex chromosomes and show differences in essentiality between males and females.
