= Shifman Mattress Company =

New Jersey mattress maker founded 1893

Shifman Mattress Company (established in 1893) is a manufacturer and distributor of handcrafted sleeping mattresses. The mattresses are made using hand-tufting techniques, eight-way hand-tied boxsprings, natural materials, and are two-sided. The company's headquarters are located in Newark, New Jersey.

== History ==
Shifman & Bro. Mattress Company was founded in 1893 when brothers, Abraham and Samuel Shifman established a bedding manufacturing company. Twenty-three years later, Samuel bought out his brother's interest and changed the company's name to Shifman Bros., Inc. when his three sons, Milton, Simon and Arthur joined the company. In 1918, the company moved to its current location at One Mott Street in Newark, NJ. Throughout the 20th century, the Shifman family was slow to adjust to changes in the industry. Consumers wanted firmer bedding, more fashionable covers and brand name recognition.

In 1985, Mike Hammer purchased the company from Robert and Burton Shifman, grandsons of Samuel. Over the next several years, Hammer changed the name to Shifman Mattress Company and instituted improvements to manufacturing and design procedure.

In 1994, Mike's youngest son, Bill, joined the company and is currently the company's president. In 2008, the company expanded its facility by 40 percent in order to enhance its manufacturing capabilities and meet the growing demand for its mattresses.

== Products and process ==
Shifman Mattresses are two-sided and handmade using techniques including hand-tufting, natural cotton and eight-way, hand-tied box springs. Boxsprings are prepared by combining frames built with Canadian Spruce wood and hourglass-shaped steel upholstery-grade coils. The coils are interlaced with Italian twine using Shifman's eight-way, hand-tying system. The layers of cotton and upholstery are combined using a hand-tufting process popularly known in the early 20th century as Sanotuft. Hand-tufting securely locks the mattress' elements in place using a large needle replacing the button with a less noticeable stitch. The average Shifman mattress takes anywhere from 7 ½ to 12 ½ hours to produce.
