= Darwin's Dangerous Idea =

1995 book by Daniel Dennett

- Cover of the first edition
- Author: Daniel C. Dennett
- Language: English
- Subjects: Evolution; ethics
- Published: 1995 (Simon & Schuster)
- Publication place: United States
- Media type: Print (hardcover · paperback)
- Pages: 586
- ISBN: 978-0-684-80290-9 (hardcover); 978-0-684-82471-0 (paperback)

Darwin's Dangerous Idea: Evolution and the Meanings of Life is a 1995 book by the philosopher Daniel Dennett, in which the author looks at some of the repercussions of Darwinian theory. The crux of the argument is that, whether or not Darwin's theories are overturned, there is no going back from the dangerous idea that design (purpose or what something is for) might not need a designer. Dennett makes this case on the basis that natural selection is a blind process, which is nevertheless sufficiently powerful to explain the evolution of life. Darwin's discovery was that the generation of life worked algorithmically, proceeding in such a way that its results are unavoidable.

Dennett says, for example, that by claiming that minds cannot be reduced to purely algorithmic processes, many of his eminent contemporaries are claiming that miracles can occur. These assertions have generated a great deal of debate and discussion in the general public. The book was a finalist for the 1995 National Book Award for Nonfiction and the 1996 Pulitzer Prize for General Nonfiction.

== Background ==
Dennett's previous book was Consciousness Explained (1991). Dennett noted discomfort with Darwinism among not only lay people but also even academics and decided it was time to write a book dealing with the subject. Darwin's Dangerous Idea is not meant to be a work of science, but rather an interdisciplinary book; Dennett admits that he does not understand all of the scientific details himself. He goes into a moderate level of detail, but leaves it for the reader to go into greater depth if desired, providing references to this end.

In writing the book, Dennett wanted to "get thinkers in other disciplines to take evolutionary theory seriously, to show them how they have been underestimating it, and to show them why they have been listening to the wrong sirens". To do this he tells a story; one that is mainly original but includes some material from his previous work.

Dennett taught an undergraduate seminar at Tufts University on Darwin and philosophy, which included most of the ideas in the book. He also had the help of fellow staff and other academics, some of whom read drafts of the book. It is dedicated to W. V. O. Quine, "teacher and friend".

== Synopsis ==
=== Part I: Starting in the Middle ===
"Starting in the Middle", Part I of Darwin's Dangerous Idea, gets its name from a quote by Willard Van Orman Quine: "Analyze theory-building how we will, we all must start in the middle. Our conceptual firsts are middle-sized, middle-distance objects, and our introduction to them and to everything comes midway in the cultural evolution of the race."

The first chapter "Tell Me Why" is named after a song.

Tell me why the stars do shine,

Tell me why the ivy twines,
Tell me why the sky's so blue.
Then I will tell you just why I love you.

Because God made the stars to shine,
Because God made the ivy twine,
Because God made the sky so blue.

Because God made you, that's why I love you.

Before Charles Darwin, and still today, a majority of people see God as the ultimate cause of all design, or the ultimate answer to 'why?' questions. John Locke argued for the primacy of mind before matter, and David Hume, while exposing problems with Locke's view, could not see any alternative.

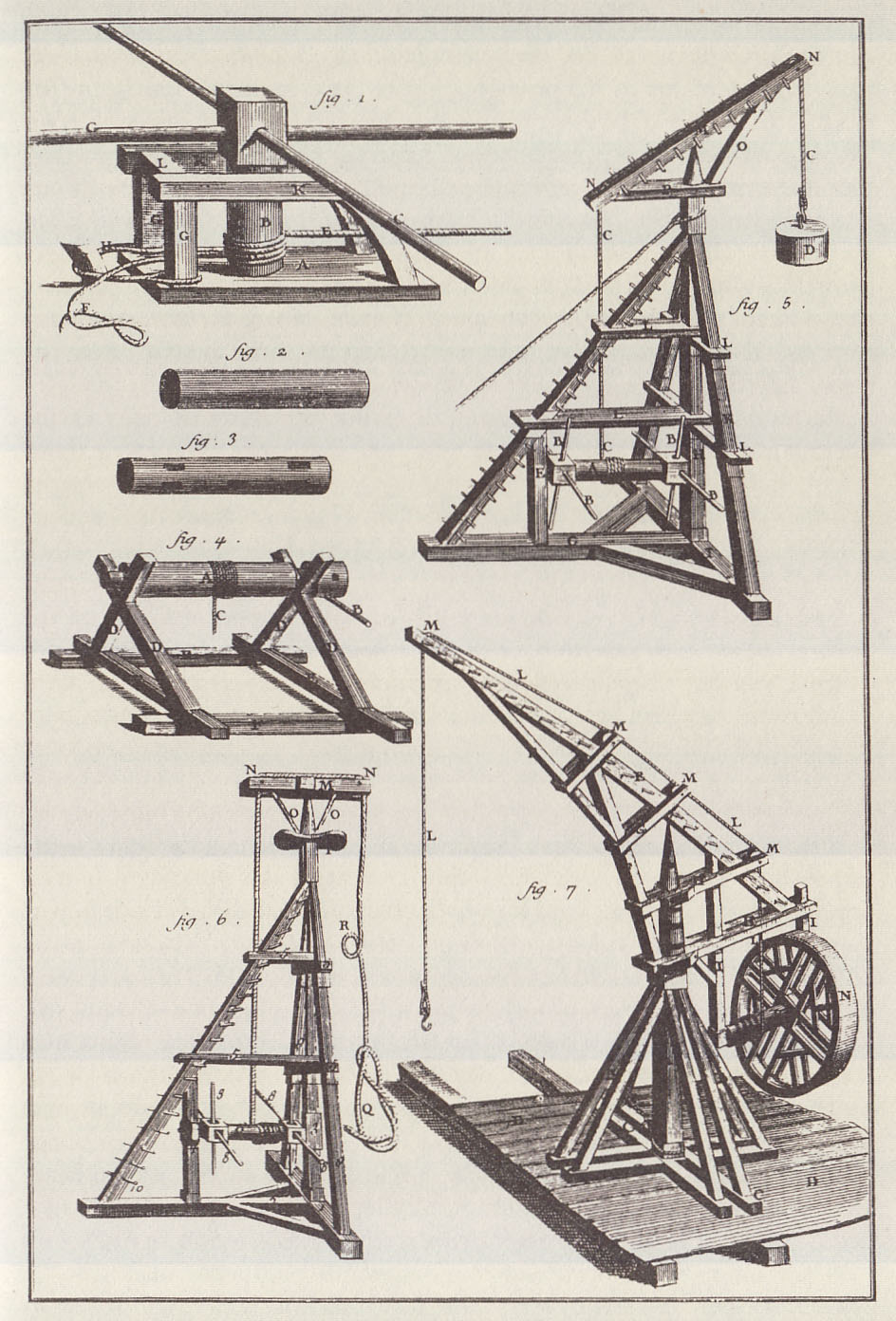
Darwin's Dangerous Idea makes extensive use of cranes as an analogy.

Darwin provided just such an alternative: evolution. Besides providing evidence of common descent, he introduced a mechanism to explain it: natural selection. According to Dennett, natural selection is a mindless, mechanical and algorithmic process—Darwin's dangerous idea. The third chapter introduces the concept of "skyhooks" and "cranes" (see below). He suggests that resistance to Darwinism is based on a desire for skyhooks, which do not really exist. According to Dennett, good reductionists explain apparent design without skyhooks; greedy reductionists try to explain it without cranes.

Chapter 4 looks at the tree of life, such as how it can be visualized and some crucial events in life's history. The next chapter concerns the possible and the actual, using the 'Library of Mendel' (the space of all logically possible genomes) as a conceptual aid.

In the last chapter of part I, Dennett treats human artifacts and culture as a branch of a unified Design Space. Descent or homology can be detected by shared design features that would be unlikely to appear independently. However, there are also "Forced Moves" or "Good Tricks" that will be discovered repeatedly, either by natural selection (see convergent evolution) or human investigation.

=== Part II: Darwinian Thinking in Biology ===
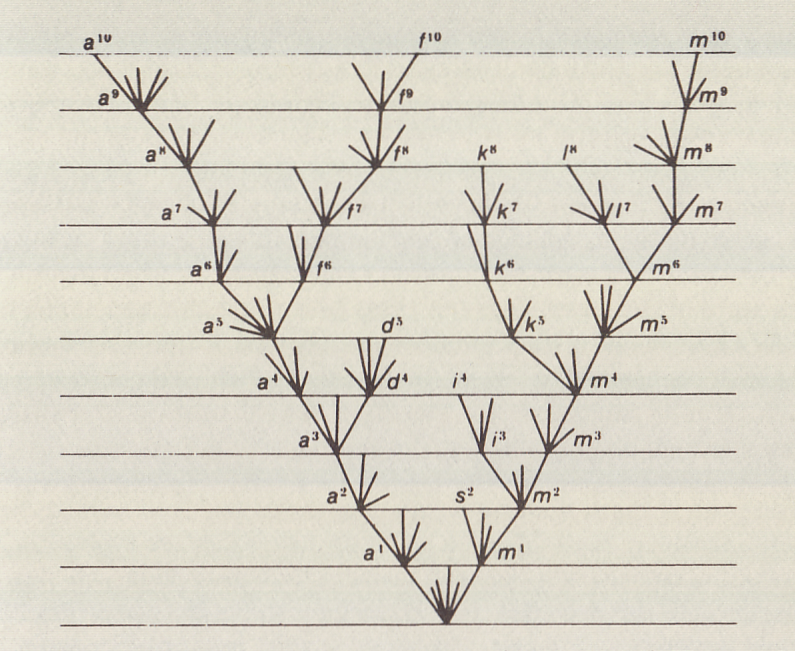
Tree diagram in Origin

The first chapter of part II, "Darwinian Thinking in Biology", asserts that life originated without any skyhooks, and the orderly world we know is the result of a blind and undirected shuffle through chaos.

The eighth chapter's message is conveyed by its title, "Biology is Engineering"; biology is the study of design, function, construction and operation. However, there are some important differences between biology and engineering. Related to the engineering concept of optimization, the next chapter deals with adaptationism, which Dennett endorses, calling Gould and Lewontin's "refutation" of it an illusion. Dennett thinks adaptationism is, in fact, the best way of uncovering constraints.

The tenth chapter, entitled "Bully for Brontosaurus", is an extended critique of Stephen Jay Gould, who Dennett feels has created a distorted view of evolution with his popular writings; his "self-styled revolutions" against adaptationism, gradualism and other orthodox Darwinism all being false alarms. The final chapter of part II dismisses directed mutation, the inheritance of acquired traits and Teilhard's "Omega Point", and insists that other controversies and hypotheses (like the unit of selection and Panspermia) have no dire consequences for orthodox Darwinism.

=== Part III: Mind, Meaning, Mathematics and Morality ===
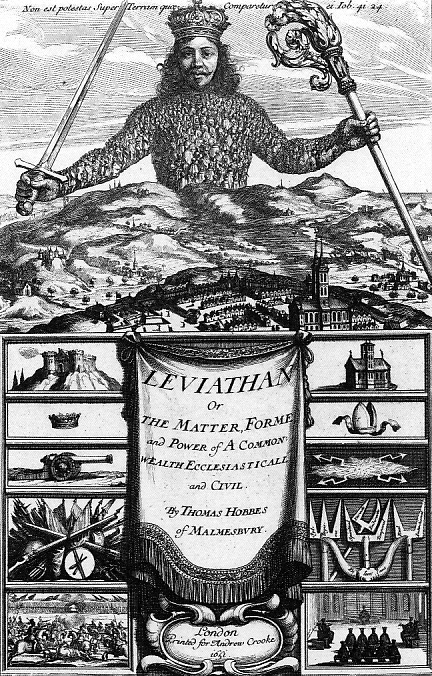
The frontispiece to Thomas Hobbes' Leviathan, which appears at the beginning of chapter 16 "On the Origin of Morality".

"Mind, Meaning, Mathematics and Morality" is the name of Part III, which begins with a quote from Nietzsche. Chapter 12, "The Cranes of Culture", discusses cultural evolution. It asserts that the meme has a role to play in our understanding of culture, and that it allows humans, alone among animals, to "transcend" our selfish genes. "Losing Our Minds to Darwin" follows, a chapter about the evolution of brains, minds and language. Dennett criticizes Noam Chomsky's perceived resistance to the evolution of language, its modeling by artificial intelligence, and reverse engineering.

The evolution of meaning is then discussed, and Dennett uses a series of thought experiments to persuade the reader that meaning is the product of meaningless, algorithmic processes.

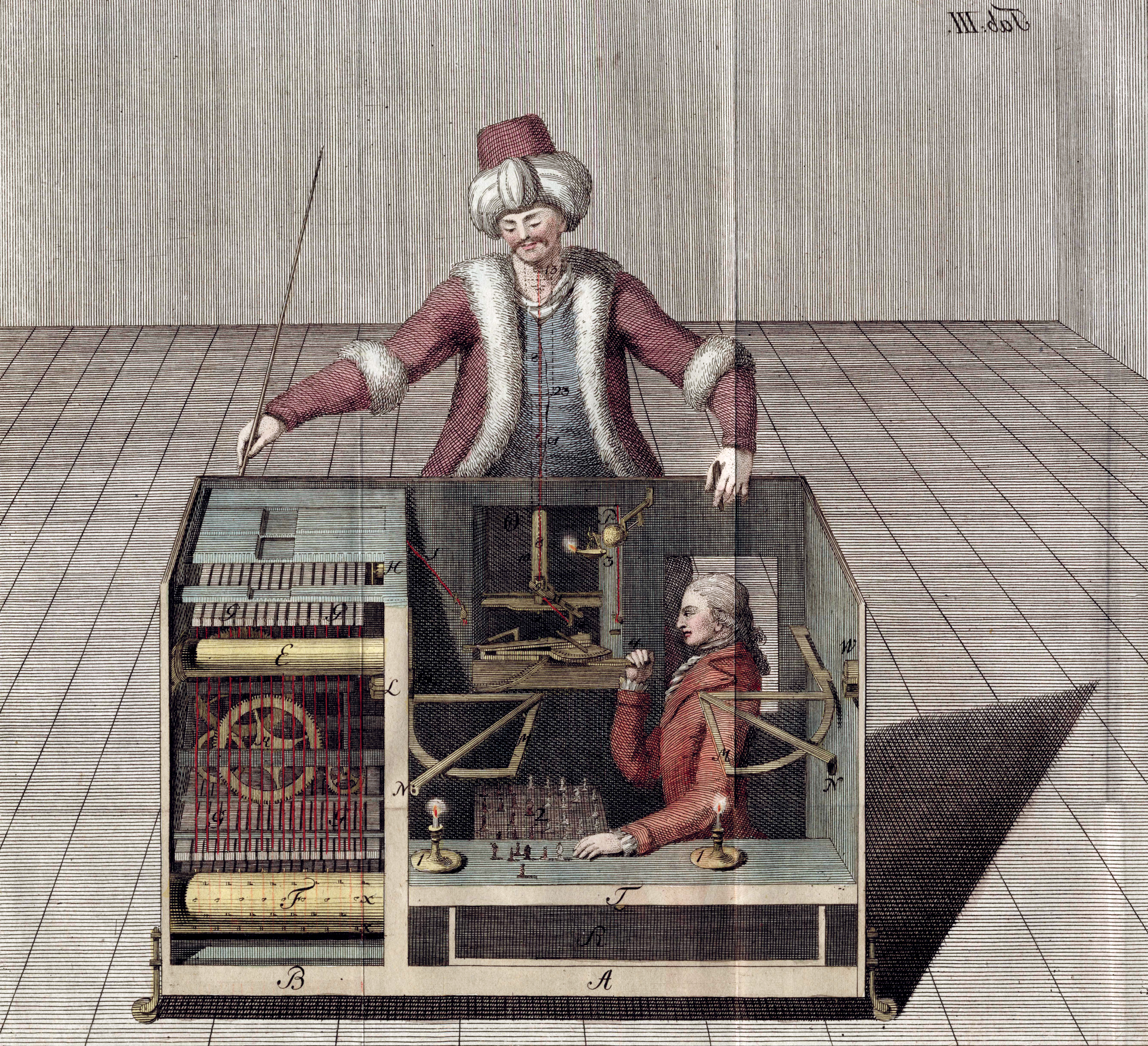
Von Kempelen's chess automaton, discussed in chapter 15.

Chapter 15 asserts that Gödel's Theorem does not make certain sorts of artificial intelligence impossible. Dennett extends his criticism to Roger Penrose. The subject then moves on to the origin and evolution of morality, beginning with Thomas Hobbes (who Dennett calls "the first sociobiologist") and Friedrich Nietzsche. He concludes that only an evolutionary analysis of ethics makes sense, though he cautions against some varieties of 'greedy ethical reductionism'. Before moving to the next chapter, he discusses some sociobiology controversies.

The penultimate chapter, entitled "Redesigning Morality", begins by asking if ethics can be 'naturalized'. Dennett does not believe there is much hope of discovering an algorithm for doing the right thing, but expresses optimism in our ability to design and redesign our approach to moral problems. In "The Future of an Idea", the book's last chapter, Dennett praises biodiversity, including cultural diversity. In closing, he uses Beauty and the Beast as an analogy; although Darwin's idea may seem dangerous, it is actually quite beautiful.

== Central concepts ==
=== Design Space ===
Dennett believes there is little or no principled difference between the naturally generated products of evolution and the man-made artifacts of human creativity and culture. For this reason he indicates deliberately that the complex fruits of the tree of life are in a very meaningful sense "designed"—even though he does not believe evolution was guided by a higher intelligence.

Dennett supports using the notion of memes to better understand cultural evolution. He also believes even human creativity might operate by the Darwinian mechanism. This leads him to propose that the "space" describing biological "design" is connected with the space describing human culture and technology.

A precise mathematical definition of Design Space is not given in Darwin's Dangerous Idea. Dennett acknowledges this and admits he is offering a philosophical idea rather than a scientific formulation.

=== Natural selection as an algorithm ===
Dennett describes natural selection as a substrate-neutral, mindless algorithm for moving through Design Space.

=== Universal acid ===
Dennett writes about the fantasy of a "universal acid" as a liquid that is so corrosive that it would eat through anything that it came into contact with, even a potential container. Such a powerful substance would transform everything it was applied to; leaving something very different in its wake. This is where Dennett draws parallels from the “universal acid” to Darwin's idea:

it eats through just about every traditional concept, and leaves in its wake a revolutionized world-view, with most of the old landmarks still recognizable, but transformed in fundamental ways.

While there are people who would like to see Darwin's idea contained within the field of biology, Dennett asserts that this dangerous idea inevitably “leaks” out to transform other fields as well.

=== Skyhooks and cranes ===
Dennett uses the term "skyhook" to describe a source of design complexity that does not build on lower, simpler layers—in simple terms, a miracle.

In philosophical arguments concerning the reducibility (or otherwise) of the human mind, Dennett's concept pokes fun at the idea of intelligent design emanating from on high, either originating from one or more gods, or providing its own grounds in an absurd, Munchausen-like bootstrapping manner.

Dennett also accuses various competing neo-Darwinian ideas of making use of such supposedly unscientific skyhooks in explaining evolution, coming down particularly hard on the ideas of Stephen Jay Gould.

Dennett contrasts theories of complexity that require such miracles with those based on "cranes", structures that permit the construction of entities of greater complexity but are themselves founded solidly "on the ground" of physical science.

== Reception ==
In The New York Review of Books, John Maynard Smith praised Darwin's Dangerous Idea:

It is therefore a pleasure to meet a philosopher who understands what Darwinism is about, and approves of it. Dennett goes well beyond biology. He sees Darwinism as a corrosive acid, capable of dissolving our earlier belief and forcing a reconsideration of much of sociology and philosophy. Although modestly written, this is not a modest book. Dennett argues that, if we understand Darwin's dangerous idea, we are forced to reject or modify much of our current intellectual baggage...

Writing in the same publication, Stephen Jay Gould criticised Darwin's Dangerous Idea for being an "influential but misguided ultra-Darwinian manifesto":

Daniel Dennett devotes the longest chapter in Darwin's Dangerous Idea to an excoriating caricature of my ideas, all in order to bolster his defense of Darwinian fundamentalism. If an argued case can be discerned at all amid the slurs and sneers, it would have to be described as an effort to claim that I have, thanks to some literary skill, tried to raise a few piddling, insignificant, and basically conventional ideas to "revolutionary" status, challenging what he takes to be the true Darwinian scripture. Since Dennett shows so little understanding of evolutionary theory beyond natural selection, his critique of my work amounts to little more than sniping at false targets of his own construction. He never deals with my ideas as such, but proceeds by hint, innuendo, false attribution, and error.

Gould was also a harsh critic of Dennett's idea of the "universal acid" of natural selection and of his subscription to the idea of memetics; Dennett responded, and the exchange between Dennett, Gould, and Robert Wright was printed in the New York Review of Books.

Biologist H. Allen Orr wrote a critical review emphasizing similar points in the Boston Review.

== See also ==
- Bayes' theorem
- Jerry Fodor
- John Searle
- Universal Darwinism
