= Limor Shifman =

Israeli communications professor

Limor Shifman (Hebrew: לימור שיפמן) is a professor of communication at the Hebrew University of Jerusalem and is the Vice Dean of the Faculty of Social Sciences. She is most recognized for researching and developing an area of study surrounding Internet memes, a subarea of digital culture and digital media research. From 2009 until 2021 Shifman primarily focused on the research area of memetics, a more broad area of research interested in cultural evolution of ideas. During that time, she became the second most cited academic author on the subject of memes, following Richard Dawkins who coined the term. She is married to neurogeneticist Sagiv Shifman.

== Education and career ==
Limor Shifman initially worked in theater and media as a writer, producer and presenter. Her work researched the history of Israeli humor and popular culture for the Department of Children and Youth, Israel Public Television. Shifman completed her doctoral work at the Hebrew University of Jerusalem's Department of Communication and Journalism where she maintains a professorship. After completing her dissertation, in 2005 she became a research fellow at the Oxford Internet Institute. Since the late 2000s, her work shifted from the history of Israeli humor and television research to what she eventually would call Internet memetics. Since early 2020, her work has shifted away from internet memetics, refocusing on social media platform governance, value expression, and cross-national/cultural behavior.

== Internet memetics ==
After the decline in interest of memetics in anthropology, Shifman provided a text for why memetics should be redeveloped within a media and communication-oriented framework. In this text she defines internet memes to be the following:

(a) a group of digital items sharing common characteristics of content, form, and/or stance, which (b) were created with awareness of each other, and (c) were circulated, imitated, and/or transformed via the Internet by many users.

Further, she outlines content as "both ideas and ideologies", form as "the physical incarnation of the message", and stance as "the information memes convey about their own communication." Stance is about how actors (e.g. people) position themselves in relation to content and form of the media as well as those who might be addressed by the message. Prior to Shifman, few researchers defined memes with communication-oriented development.

In defining memes this way, she notes that the earlier memetics research struggled in distinguishing memes from meme-vehicles, and suggests that attempting to do so was a failed project. She cites Susan Blackmore as providing the metaphysical outline which inspired her memetic concept, arguing that much of memetics prior to her conception was either behaviorist- or mentalist-driven, taking sides in arguing that memes were respectively accounted for as material behavior or as a theory of cognition. She rejects these two sides and opts for what she calls an "inclusivist" approach, which denies that the memetic research can cleanly dissect memes into a cultural idea and its medium. She credits Blackmore as being the only other popular memetics researcher who does the same. By empirically connecting memes to digital media, Shifman provided theoretical developments in memetics which diverge from earlier interests. As such, Internet memetics often avoids strong associations with historical arguments from cultural anthropology, theory of mind, and philosophy of biology. Instead, they operate across several theoretical paradigms of sociology, communication, and media.

Shifman's theorizing in Internet memetics has been mentioned in journals such as Internet, Communication, & Society, New Media & Society, and Social Media + Society.

Internet memetics research is more specific than research in "Internet Memes." For example, many studying Internet memes argue they are developing different theoretical interests, such as pragmatics or semiotics. Despite these theoretical distinctions in interest, many of these authors cite Internet memetic theory as having overt similarities in empirical interests to Shifman.
