= Meme =

Cultural idea that spreads through imitation

A meme (/miːm/; MEEM) is an idea, behavior, or style that spreads by means of imitation (mimesis) from person to person within a culture and often carries symbolic meaning representing a particular phenomenon or theme. A meme acts as a unit for carrying cultural ideas, symbols, or practices, that can be transmitted from one mind to another through writing, speech, gestures, rituals, or other imitable phenomena with a mimicked theme. Supporters of the concept regard memes as cultural analogues to genes in that they self-replicate, mutate, and respond to selective pressures. In popular language, a meme may refer to an Internet meme, typically an image, that is remixed, copied, and circulated in a shared cultural experience online.

Proponents theorize that memes are a viral phenomenon that may evolve by natural selection in a manner analogous to that of biological evolution. Memes do this through processes analogous to those of variation, mutation, competition, and inheritance, each of which influences a meme's reproductive success. Memes spread through the behavior that they generate in their hosts. Memes that propagate less prolifically may become extinct, while others may survive, spread, and (for better or for worse) mutate. Memes that replicate most effectively enjoy more success, and some may replicate effectively even when they prove to be detrimental to the welfare of their hosts.

A field of study called memetics arose in the 1990s to explore the concepts and transmission of memes in terms of an evolutionary model. Criticism from a variety of fronts has challenged the notion that academic study can examine memes empirically. However, developments in neuroimaging may make empirical study possible. Some commentators in the social sciences question the idea that one can meaningfully categorize culture in terms of discrete units, and are especially critical of the biological nature of the theory's underpinnings. Others have argued that this use of the term is the result of a misunderstanding of the original proposal.

The word meme itself is a neologism coined by Richard Dawkins, originating from his 1976 book The Selfish Gene. Dawkins's own position is somewhat ambiguous. He welcomed N. K. Humphrey's suggestion that "memes should be considered as living structures, not just metaphorically", and proposed to regard memes as "physically residing in the brain". Although Dawkins said his original intentions had been simpler, he approved Humphrey's opinion and he endorsed Susan Blackmore's 1999 project to give a scientific theory of memes, complete with predictions and empirical support.

== Etymology ==
The term meme is a shortening (modeled on gene) of mimeme, which comes from Ancient Greek mīmēma (μίμημα; pronounced [míːmɛːma]), meaning 'imitated thing', itself from mimeisthai (μιμεῖσθαι, 'to imitate'), from mimos (μῖμος, 'mime').

The word was coined by British evolutionary biologist Richard Dawkins in The Selfish Gene (1976) as a concept for discussion of evolutionary principles in explaining the spread of ideas and cultural phenomena. Examples of memes given in Dawkins' book include melodies, catchphrases, fashion, and the technology of building arches.

== Origins ==
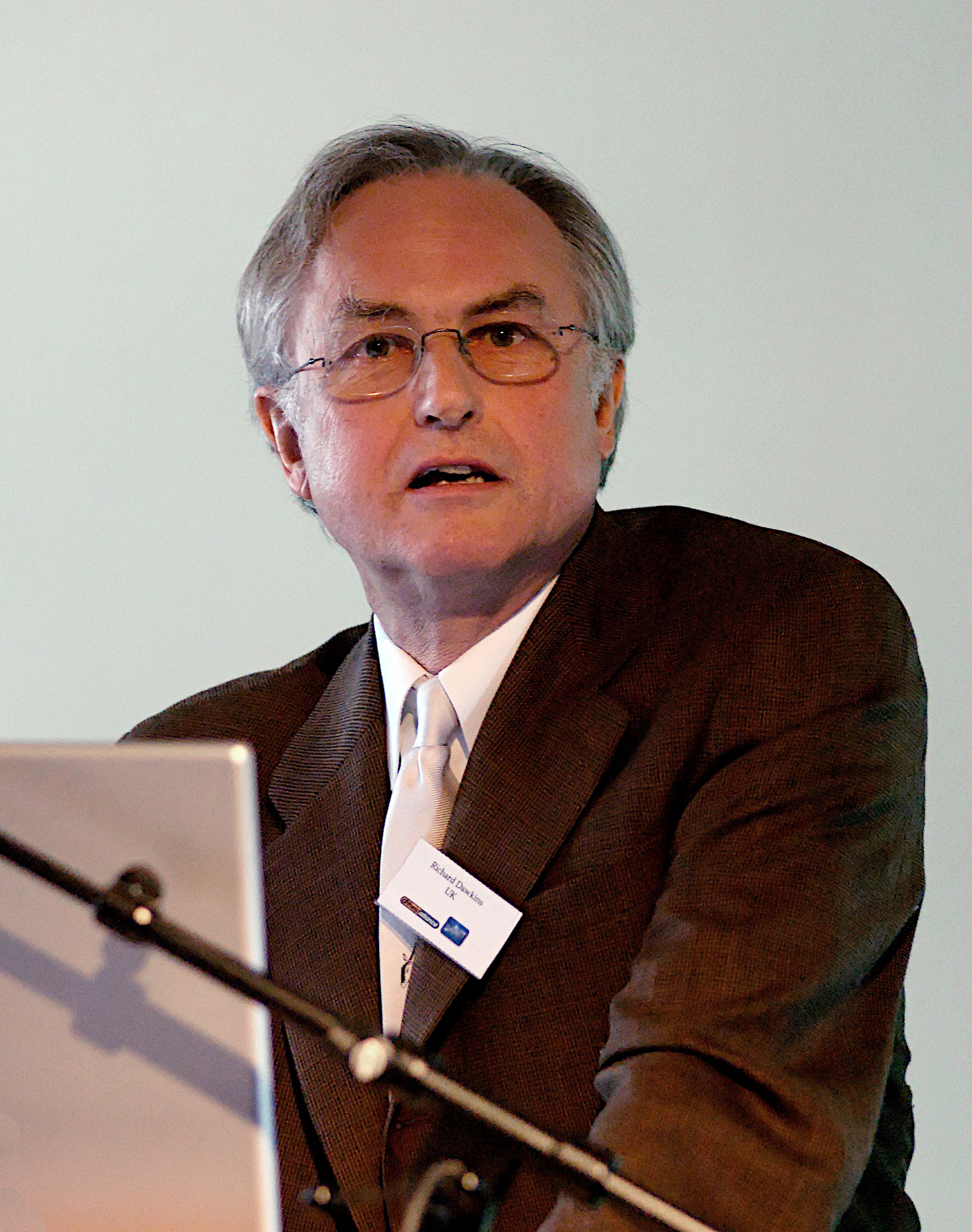
Richard Dawkins coined the word meme in his 1976 book The Selfish Gene.

=== Early formulations ===
Although Richard Dawkins invented the term meme and developed meme theory, he has not claimed that the idea was entirely novel, and there have been other expressions for similar ideas in the past.

For instance, the possibility that ideas were subject to the same pressures of evolution as were biological attributes was discussed in the time of Charles Darwin. T. H. Huxley (1880) claimed that "The struggle for existence holds as much in the intellectual as in the physical world. A theory is a species of thinking, and its right to exist is coextensive with its power of resisting extinction by its rivals." G. K. Chesterton (1922) observed the similarity between intellectual systems and living organisms, noting that a certain degree of complexity, rather than being a hindrance, is a necessity for continued survival.

In 1904, Richard Semon published Die Mneme (which appeared in English in 1924 as The Mneme). The term mneme was also used in Maurice Maeterlinck's The Life of the White Ant (1926), with some parallels to Dawkins's concept. Kenneth Pike had, in 1954, coined the related terms emic and etic, generalizing the linguistic units of phoneme, morpheme, grapheme, lexeme, and tagmeme (as set out by Leonard Bloomfield), distinguishing insider and outside views of communicative behavior.

=== Dawkins ===
The word meme originated with Richard Dawkins' 1976 book The Selfish Gene.

Dawkins cites as inspiration the work of geneticist L. L. Cavalli-Sforza, anthropologist F. T. Cloak, and ethologist J. M. Cullen. Dawkins wrote that evolution depended not on the particular chemical basis of genetics, but only on the existence of a self-replicating unit of transmission—in the case of biological evolution, the gene. For Dawkins, the meme exemplified another self-replicating unit with potential significance in explaining human behavior and cultural evolution.

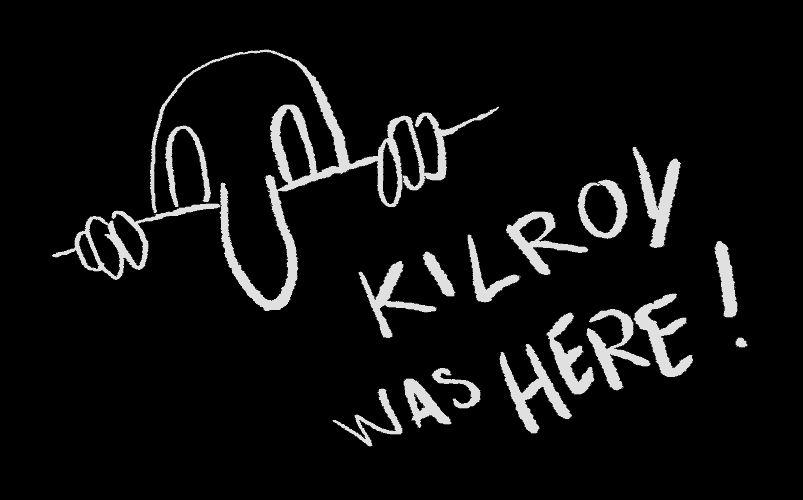
"Kilroy was here" was a graffito that became popular in the 1940s, and existed under various names in different countries, illustrating how a meme can be modified through replication. This is seen as one of the first widespread memes in the world.

Dawkins used the term to refer to any cultural entity that an observer might consider a replicator. He hypothesized that one could view many cultural entities as replicators, and pointed to melodies, fashions and learned skills as examples. Memes generally replicate through exposure to humans, who have evolved as efficient copiers of information and behavior. Because humans do not always copy memes perfectly, and because they may refine, combine or otherwise modify them with other memes to create new memes, they can change over time. Dawkins likened the process by which memes survive and change through the evolution of culture to the natural selection of genes in biological evolution.

Dawkins noted that in a society with culture a person need not have biological descendants to remain influential in the actions of individuals thousands of years after their death:

But if you contribute to the world's culture, if you have a good idea...it may live on, intact, long after your genes have dissolved in the common pool. Socrates may or may not have a gene or two alive in the world today, as G.C. Williams has remarked, but who cares? The meme-complexes of Socrates, Leonardo, Copernicus and Marconi are still going strong.

In that context, Dawkins defined the meme as a unit of cultural transmission, or a unit of imitation and replication, but later definitions would vary. The lack of a consistent, rigorous, and precise understanding of what typically makes up one unit of cultural transmission remains a problem in debates about memetics. In contrast, the concept of genetics gained concrete evidence with the discovery of the biological functions of DNA. Meme transmission requires a physical medium, such as photons, sound waves, touch, taste, or smell because memes can be transmitted only through the senses.

=== After Dawkins: Role of physical media ===
Initially, Dawkins did not seriously give context to the material of memetics. He considered a meme to be an idea, and thus a mental concept. However, from Dawkins' initial conception, it is how a medium might function in relation to the meme which has garnered the most attention. For example, David Hull suggested that while memes might exist as Dawkins conceives of them, he finds it important to suggest that instead of determining them as idea "replicators" (i.e. mind-determinant influences) one might notice that the medium itself has an influence in the meme's evolutionary outcomes. Thus, he refers to the medium as an "interactor" to avoid this determinism. Alternatively, Daniel Dennett suggests that the medium and the idea are not distinct in that memes only exist because of their medium. Dennett argued this in order to remain consistent with his denial of qualia and the notion of materially deterministic evolution which was consistent with Dawkins' account. A particularly more divergent theory is that of Limor Shifman, a communication and media scholar of "Internet memetics". She argues that any memetic argument which claims the distinction between the meme and the meme-vehicle (i.e. the meme's medium) are empirically observable is mistaken from the offset. Shifman claims to be following a similar theoretical direction as Susan Blackmore; however, her attention to the media surrounding Internet culture has enabled Internet memetic research to depart in empirical interests from previous memetic goals. Regardless of Internet Memetic's divergence in theoretical interests, it plays a significant role in theorizing and empirically investigating the connection between cultural ideologies, behaviors, and their mediation processes.

== Memetic lifecycle: transmission, retention ==
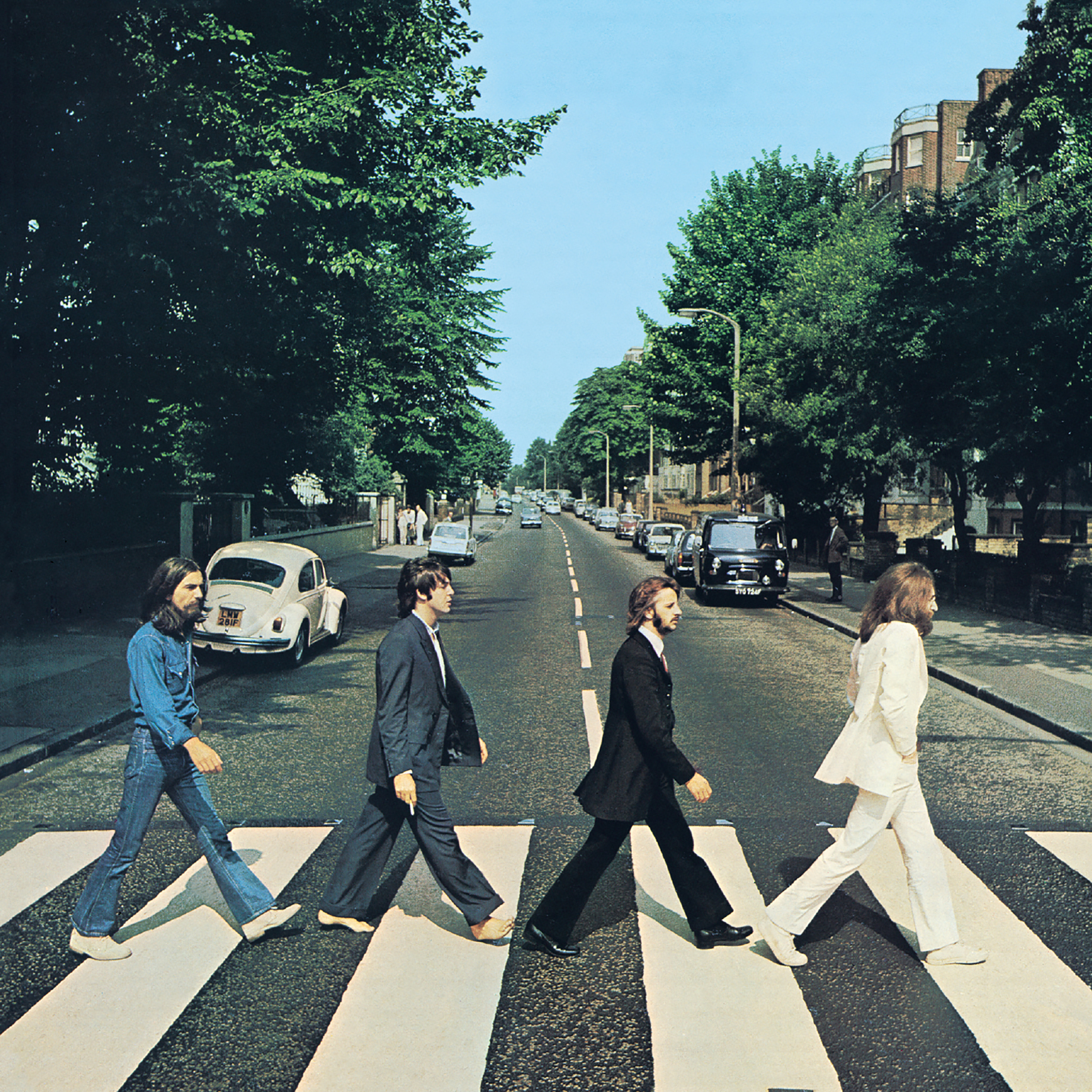
Album cover of Abbey Road (1969) by the Beatles, on which the band members cross the road in front of the Abbey Road Studios in a row

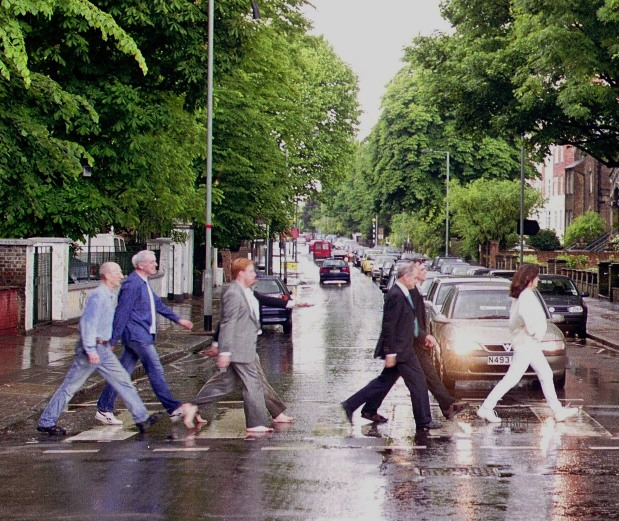
Imitating the cover of Abbey Road has become popular with fans and London visitors.

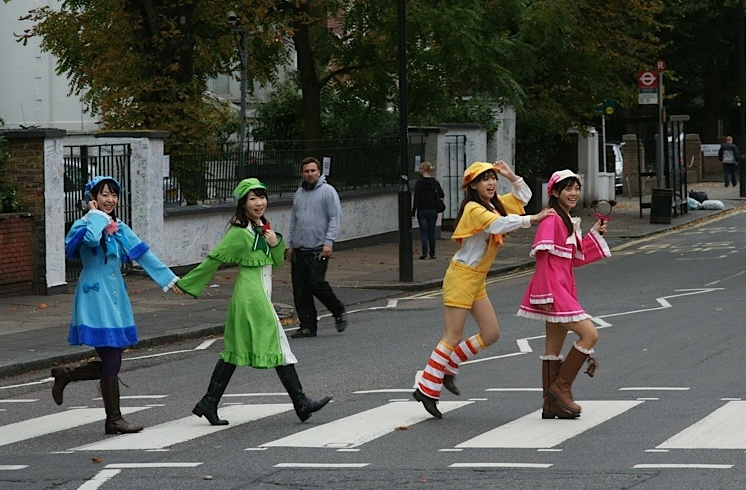
The four actresses of the Japanese media franchise Milky Holmes reenact the Beatles cover in 2010, extending the original Beatles meme by their film costumes.

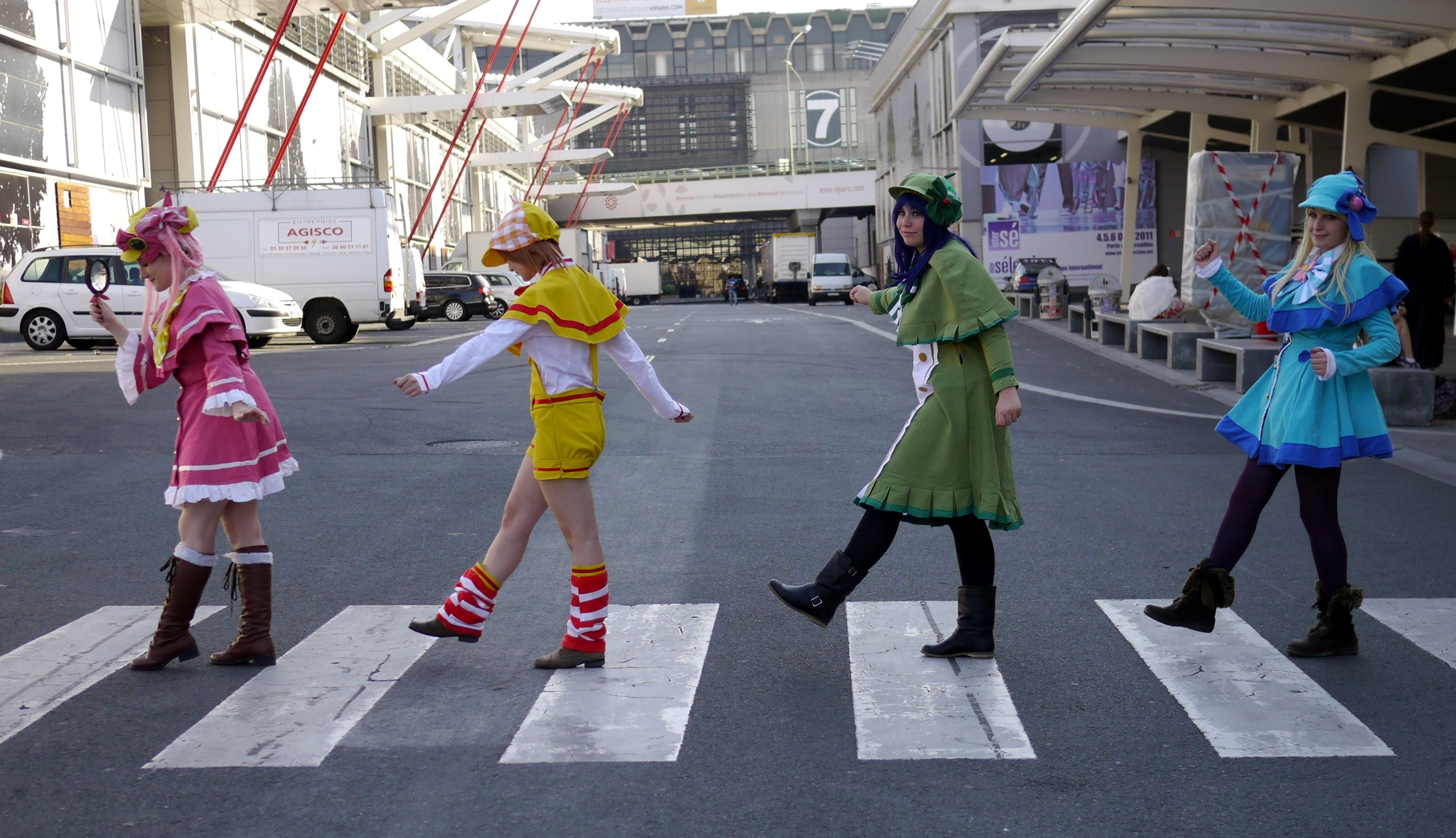
In 2011, four cosplayers imitate the above meme during the manga convention Paris Manga 2012 at a zebra crossing in Paris, thus further separating the meme from the root situation of 1969 tied to the Abbey Road zebra crossing.

Memes, analogously to genes, vary in their aptitude to replicate; successful memes remain and spread, whereas unfit ones stall and are forgotten. Thus, memes that prove more effective at replicating and surviving are selected in the meme pool.

Memes first need retention. The longer a meme stays in its hosts, the higher its chances of propagation are. When a host uses a meme, the meme's life is extended. The reuse of the neural space hosting a certain meme's copy to host different memes is the greatest threat to that meme's copy. A meme that increases the longevity of its hosts will generally survive longer. On the contrary, a meme that shortens the longevity of its hosts will tend to disappear faster. However, as hosts are mortal, retention is not sufficient to perpetuate a meme in the long term; memes also need transmission.

Life-forms can transmit information both vertically (from parent to child, via replication of genes) and horizontally (through viruses and other means). Memes can replicate vertically or horizontally within a single biological generation. They may also lie dormant for long periods of time.

Memes reproduce by copying from a nervous system to another one, either by communication or imitation. Imitation often involves the copying of an observed behavior of another individual. Communication may be direct or indirect, where memes transmit from one individual to another through a copy recorded in an inanimate source, such as a book or a musical score. Adam McNamara has suggested that memes can be thereby classified as either internal or external memes (i-memes or e-memes).

Some commentators have likened the transmission of memes to the spread of contagions. Social contagions such as fads, hysteria, copycat crime, and copycat suicide exemplify memes seen as the contagious imitation of ideas. Observers distinguish the contagious imitation of memes from instinctively contagious phenomena such as yawning and laughing, which they consider innate (rather than socially learned) behaviors.

Aaron Lynch described seven general patterns of meme transmission, or "thought contagion":

1. Quantity of parenthood: an idea that influences the number of children one has. Children respond particularly receptively to the ideas of their parents, and thus ideas that directly or indirectly encourage a higher birth rate will replicate themselves at a higher rate than those that discourage higher birth rates.
2. Efficiency of parenthood: an idea that increases the proportion of children who will adopt ideas of their parents. Cultural separatism exemplifies one practice in which one can expect a higher rate of meme-replication—because the meme for separation creates a barrier from exposure to competing ideas.
3. Proselytic: ideas generally passed to others beyond one's own children. Ideas that encourage the proselytism of a meme, as seen in many religious or political movements, can replicate memes horizontally through a given generation, spreading more rapidly than parent-to-child meme-transmissions do.
4. Preservational: ideas that influence those that hold them to continue to hold them for a long time. Ideas that encourage longevity in their hosts, or leave their hosts particularly resistant to abandoning or replacing these ideas, enhance the preservability of memes and afford protection from the competition or proselytism of other memes.
5. Adversative: ideas that influence those that hold them to attack or sabotage competing ideas and/or those that hold them. Adversative replication can give an advantage in meme transmission when the meme itself encourages aggression against other memes.
6. Cognitive: ideas perceived as cogent by most in the population who encounter them. Cognitively transmitted memes depend heavily on a cluster of other ideas and cognitive traits already widely held in the population, and thus usually spread more passively than other forms of meme transmission. Memes spread in cognitive transmission do not count as self-replicating.
7. Motivational: ideas that people adopt because they perceive some self-interest in adopting them. Strictly speaking, motivationally transmitted memes do not self-propagate, but this mode of transmission often occurs in association with memes self-replicated in the efficiency parental, proselytic and preservational modes.

== Memes as discrete units ==
Dawkins initially defined meme as a noun that "conveys the idea of a unit of cultural transmission, or a unit of imitation". John S. Wilkins retained the notion of meme as a kernel of cultural imitation while emphasizing the meme's evolutionary aspect, defining the meme as "the least unit of sociocultural information relative to a selection process that has favorable or unfavorable selection bias that exceeds its endogenous tendency to change". The meme as a unit provides a convenient means of discussing "a piece of thought copied from person to person", regardless of whether that thought contains others inside it, or forms part of a larger meme. A meme could consist of a single word, or a meme could consist of the entire speech in which that word first occurred. This forms an analogy to the idea of a gene as a single unit of self-replicating information found on the self-replicating chromosome.

While the identification of memes as "units" conveys their nature to replicate as discrete, indivisible entities, it does not imply that thoughts somehow become quantized or that "atomic" ideas exist that cannot be dissected into smaller pieces. A meme has no given size. Susan Blackmore writes that melodies from Beethoven's symphonies are commonly used to illustrate the difficulty involved in delimiting memes as discrete units. She notes that while the first four notes of Beethoven's Fifth Symphony form a meme widely replicated as an independent unit, one can regard the entire symphony as a single meme as well.

The inability to pin an idea or cultural feature to quantifiable key units is widely acknowledged as a problem for memetics. It has been argued however that the traces of memetic processing can be quantified utilizing neuroimaging techniques which measure changes in the "connectivity profiles between brain regions". Blackmore meets such criticism by stating that memes compare with genes in this respect: that while a gene has no particular size, nor can we ascribe every phenotypic feature directly to a particular gene, it has value because it encapsulates that key unit of inherited expression subject to evolutionary pressures. To illustrate, she notes evolution selects for the gene for features such as eye color; it does not select for the individual nucleotide in a strand of DNA. Memes play a comparable role in understanding the evolution of imitated behaviors.

Genes, Mind, and Culture: The Coevolutionary Process (1981) by Charles J. Lumsden and E. O. Wilson proposes the theory that genes and culture co-evolve, and that the fundamental biological units of culture must correspond to neuronal networks that function as nodes of semantic memory. Lumsden and Wilson coined their own word, culturgen, which did not catch on. Coauthor Wilson later acknowledged the term meme as the best label for the fundamental unit of cultural inheritance in his 1998 book Consilience: The Unity of Knowledge, which elaborates upon the fundamental role of memes in unifying the natural and social sciences.

At present, the existence of discrete cultural units which satisfy memetic theory has been challenged in a variety of ways. What is critical from this perspective is that in denying memetics unitary status is to deny a particularly fundamental part of Dawkins' original argument. In particular, denying memes are a unit, or are explainable in some clear unitary structure denies the cultural analogy that inspired Dawkins to define them. If memes are not describable as unitary, memes are not accountable within a neo-Darwinian model of evolutionary culture.

Within cultural anthropology, materialist approaches are skeptical of such units. In particular, Dan Sperber argues that memes are not unitary in the sense that there are no two instances of exactly the same cultural idea, all that can be argued is that there is material mimicry of an idea. Thus every instance of a "meme" would not be a true evolutionary unit of replication.

Dan Deacon, Kalevi Kull separately argued memes are degenerate Signs in that they offer only a partial explanation of the triadic in Charles Sanders Peirce's semiotic theory: a sign (a reference to an object), an object (the thing being referred to), and an interpretant (the interpreting actor of a sign). They argue the meme unit is a sign which only is defined by its replication ability. Accordingly, in the broadest sense, the objects of copying are memes, whereas the objects of translation and interpretation are signs. Later, Sara Cannizzaro more fully develops out this semiotic relation in order to reframe memes as being a kind of semiotic activity, however she too denies that memes are units, referring to them as "sign systems" instead.

In Limor Shifman's account of Internet memetics, she also denies memetics as being unitary. She argues memes are not unitary, however many assume they are because many previous memetic researchers confounded memes with the cultural interest in "virals": singular informational objects which spread with a particular rate and veracity such as a video or a picture. As such, Shifman argues that Dawkins' original notion of meme is closer to what communication and information studies consider digitally viral replication.

== Evolutionary influences on memes ==
Dawkins noted the three conditions that must exist for evolution to occur:

1. variation, or the introduction of new change to existing elements;
2. heredity or replication, or the capacity to create copies of elements;
3. differential "fitness", or the opportunity for one element to be more or less suited to the environment than another.

Dawkins emphasizes that the process of evolution naturally occurs whenever these conditions co-exist, and that evolution does not apply only to organic elements such as genes. He regards memes as also having the properties necessary for evolution, and thus sees meme evolution as not simply analogous to genetic evolution, but as a real phenomenon subject to the laws of natural selection. Dawkins noted that as various ideas pass from one generation to the next, they may either enhance or detract from the survival of the people who obtain those ideas, or influence the survival of the ideas themselves. For example, a certain culture may develop unique designs and methods of tool-making that give it a competitive advantage over another culture. Each tool-design thus acts somewhat similarly to a biological gene in that some populations have it and others do not, and the meme's function directly affects the presence of the design in future generations. In keeping with the thesis that in evolution one can regard organisms simply as suitable "hosts" for reproducing genes, Dawkins argues that one can view people as "hosts" for replicating memes. Consequently, a successful meme may or may not need to provide any benefit to its host.

Unlike genetic evolution, memetic evolution can show both Darwinian and Lamarckian traits. Cultural memes will have the characteristic of Lamarckian inheritance when a host aspires to replicate the given meme through inference rather than by exactly copying it. Take for example the case of the transmission of a simple skill such as hammering a nail, a skill that a learner imitates from watching a demonstration without necessarily imitating every discrete movement modeled by the teacher in the demonstration, stroke for stroke. Susan Blackmore distinguishes the difference between the two modes of inheritance in the evolution of memes, characterizing the Darwinian mode as "copying the instructions" and the Lamarckian as "copying the product".

Clusters of memes, or memeplexes (also known as meme complexes or as memecomplexes), such as cultural or political doctrines and systems, may also play a part in the acceptance of new memes. Memeplexes comprise groups of memes that replicate together and coadapt. Memes that fit within a successful memeplex may gain acceptance by "piggybacking" on the success of the memeplex. As an example, John D. Gottsch discusses the transmission, mutation and selection of religious memeplexes and the theistic memes contained. Theistic memes discussed include the "prohibition of aberrant sexual practices such as incest, adultery, homosexuality, bestiality, castration, and religious prostitution", which may have increased vertical transmission of the parent religious memeplex. Similar memes are thereby included in the majority of religious memeplexes, and harden over time; they become an "inviolable canon" or set of dogmas, eventually finding their way into secular law. This could also be referred to as the propagation of a taboo.

== Memetics ==
Memetics is the name of the field of science that studies memes and their evolution and culture spread. While the term "meme" appeared in various forms in German and Austrian texts near the turn of the 20th century, Dawkin's unrelated use of the term in The Selfish Gene marked its emergence into mainstream study. Based on the Dawkin's framing of a meme as a cultural analogue to a gene, meme theory originated as an attempt to apply biological evolutionary principles to cultural information transfer and cultural evolution. Thus, memetics attempts to apply conventional scientific methods (such as those used in population genetics and epidemiology) to explain existing patterns and transmission of cultural ideas.

=== Criticism of meme theory ===
Principal criticisms of memetics include the claim that memetics ignores established advances in other fields of cultural study, such as sociology, cultural anthropology, cognitive psychology, and social psychology. Questions remain whether or not the meme concept counts as a validly disprovable scientific theory. This view regards memetics as a theory in its infancy: a protoscience to proponents, or a pseudoscience to some detractors.

One frequent criticism of meme theory looks at the perceived gap in the gene/meme analogy. For example, Luis Benitez-Bribiesca points to the lack of a "code script" for memes (analogous to the DNA of genes), and to the excessive instability of the meme mutation mechanism (that of an idea going from one brain to another), which would lead to a low replication accuracy and a high mutation rate, rendering the evolutionary process chaotic. In his book Darwin's Dangerous Idea, Daniel C. Dennett points to the existence of self-regulating correction mechanisms (vaguely resembling those of gene transcription) enabled by the redundancy and other properties of most meme expression languages which stabilize information transfer. Dennett notes that spiritual narratives, including music and dance forms, can survive in full detail across any number of generations even in cultures with oral tradition only. In contrast, when applying only meme theory, memes for which stable copying methods are available will inevitably get selected for survival more often than those which can only have unstable mutations (such as the noted music and dance forms), which, according to meme theory, should have resulted in those forms of cultural expression going extinct.

A second common criticism of meme theory views it as a reductionist and inadequate version of more accepted anthropological theories. Kim Sterelny and Paul Griffiths noted the cumulative evolution of genes depends on biological selection-pressures neither too great nor too small in relation to mutation-rates, while pointing out there is no reason to think that the same balance will exist in the selection pressures on memes. Semiotic theorists such as Terrence Deacon and Kalevi Kull regard the concept of a meme as a primitivized or degenerate concept of a sign, containing only a sign's basic ability to be copied, but lacks other core elements of the sign concept such as translation and interpretation. Evolutionary biologist Ernst Mayr similarly disapproved of Dawkins's gene-based view of meme, asserting it to be an "unnecessary synonym" for a concept, reasoning that concepts are not restricted to an individual or a generation, may persist for long periods of time, and may evolve.

== Applications ==
Opinions differ as to how best to apply the concept of memes within a "proper" disciplinary framework. One view sees memes as providing a useful philosophical perspective with which to examine cultural evolution. Proponents of this view (such as Susan Blackmore and Daniel Dennett) argue that considering cultural developments from a meme's-eye view—as if memes themselves respond to pressure to maximise their own replication and survival—can lead to useful insights and yield valuable predictions into how culture develops over time. Others such as Bruce Edmonds and Robert Aunger have focused on the need to provide an empirical grounding for memetics to become a useful and respected scientific discipline.

A third approach, described by Joseph Poulshock, as "radical memetics" seeks to place memes at the centre of a materialistic theory of mind and of personal identity.

Prominent researchers in evolutionary psychology and anthropology, including Scott Atran, Dan Sperber, Pascal Boyer, John Tooby and others, argue the possibility of incompatibility between modularity of mind and memetics. In their view, minds structure certain communicable aspects of the ideas produced, and these communicable aspects generally trigger or elicit ideas in other minds through inference (to relatively rich structures generated from often low-fidelity input) and not high-fidelity replication or imitation. Atran discusses communication involving religious beliefs as a case in point. In one set of experiments he asked religious people to write down on a piece of paper the meanings of the Ten Commandments. Despite the subjects' own expectations of consensus, interpretations of the commandments showed wide ranges of variation, with little evidence of consensus. In another experiment, subjects with autism and subjects without autism interpreted ideological and religious sayings (for example, "Let a thousand flowers bloom" or "To everything there is a season"). People with autism showed a significant tendency to closely paraphrase and repeat content from the original statement (for example: "Don't cut flowers before they bloom"). Controls tended to infer a wider range of cultural meanings with little replicated content (for example: "Go with the flow" or "Everyone should have equal opportunity"). Only the subjects with autism—who lack the degree of inferential capacity normally associated with aspects of theory of mind—came close to functioning as "meme machines".

In his book The Robot's Rebellion, Keith Stanovich uses the memes and memeplex concepts to describe a program of cognitive reform that he refers to as a "rebellion". Specifically, Stanovich argues that the use of memes as a descriptor for cultural units is beneficial because it serves to emphasize transmission and acquisition properties that parallel the study of epidemiology. These properties make salient the sometimes parasitic nature of acquired memes, and as a result individuals should be motivated to reflectively acquire memes using what he calls a "Neurathian bootstrap" process.

=== Memetic explanations of racism ===
In Cultural Software: A Theory of Ideology, Jack Balkin argued that memetic processes can explain many of the most familiar features of ideological thought. His theory of "cultural software" maintained that memes form narratives, social networks, metaphoric and metonymic models, and a variety of different mental structures. Balkin maintains that the same structures used to generate ideas about free speech or free markets also serve to generate racistic beliefs. To Balkin, whether memes become harmful or maladaptive depends on the environmental context in which they exist rather than in any special source or manner to their origination. Balkin describes racist beliefs as "fantasy" memes that become harmful or unjust "ideologies" when diverse peoples come together, as through trade or competition.

== Religion ==
Richard Dawkins called for a re-analysis of religion in terms of the evolution of self-replicating ideas apart from any resulting biological advantages they might bestow.

As an enthusiastic Darwinian, I have been dissatisfied with explanations that my fellow-enthusiasts have offered for human behaviour. They have tried to look for 'biological advantages' in various attributes of human civilization. For instance, tribal religion has been seen as a mechanism for solidifying group identity, valuable for a pack-hunting species whose individuals rely on cooperation to catch large and fast prey. Frequently the evolutionary preconception in terms of which such theories are framed is implicitly group-selectionist, but it is possible to rephrase the theories in terms of orthodox gene selection.

— Richard Dawkins, The Selfish Gene

He argued that the role of key replicator in cultural evolution belongs not to genes, but to memes replicating thought from person to person by means of imitation. These replicators respond to selective pressures that may or may not affect biological reproduction or survival.

In her book The Meme Machine, Susan Blackmore regards religions as particularly tenacious memes. Many of the features common to the most widely practiced religions provide built-in advantages in an evolutionary context, she writes. For example, religions that preach of the value of faith over evidence from everyday experience or reason inoculate societies against many of the most basic tools people commonly use to evaluate their ideas. By linking altruism with religious affiliation, religious memes can proliferate more quickly because people perceive that they can reap societal as well as personal rewards. The longevity of religious memes improves with their documentation in revered religious texts.

Aaron Lynch attributed the robustness of religious memes in human culture to the fact that such memes incorporate multiple modes of meme transmission. Religious memes pass down the generations from parent to child and across a single generation through the meme-exchange of proselytism. Most people will hold the religion taught them by their parents throughout their life. Many religions feature adversarial elements, punishing apostasy, for instance, or demonizing infidels. In Thought Contagion Lynch identifies the memes of transmission in Christianity as especially powerful in scope. Believers view the conversion of non-believers both as a religious duty and as an act of altruism. The promise of heaven to believers and threat of hell to non-believers provide a strong incentive for members to retain their belief. Lynch asserts that belief in the Crucifixion of Jesus in Christianity amplifies each of its other replication advantages through the indebtedness believers have to their Savior for sacrifice on the cross. The image of the crucifixion recurs in religious sacraments, and the proliferation of symbols of the cross in homes and churches potently reinforces the wide array of Christian memes.

Although religious memes have proliferated in human cultures, the modern scientific community has been relatively resistant to religious belief. Robertson (2007) reasoned that if evolution is accelerated in conditions of propagative difficulty, then we would expect to encounter variations of religious memes, established in general populations, addressed to scientific communities. Using a memetic approach, Robertson deconstructed two attempts to privilege religiously held spirituality in scientific discourse. Advantages of a memetic approach as compared to more traditional "modernization" and "supply side" theses in understanding the evolution and propagation of religion were explored.

== Architectural memes ==
In A Theory of Architecture, Nikos Salingaros speaks of memes as "freely propagating clusters of information" which can be beneficial or harmful. He contrasts memes to patterns and true knowledge, characterizing memes as "greatly simplified versions of patterns" and as "unreasoned matching to some visual or mnemonic prototype". Taking reference to Dawkins, Salingaros emphasizes that they can be transmitted due to their own communicative properties, that "the simpler they are, the faster they can proliferate", and that the most successful memes "come with a great psychological appeal".

Architectural memes, according to Salingaros, can have destructive power: "Images portrayed in architectural magazines representing buildings that could not possibly accommodate everyday uses become fixed in our memory, so we reproduce them unconsciously." He lists various architectural memes that circulated since the 1920s and which, in his view, have led to contemporary architecture becoming quite decoupled from human needs. They lack connection and meaning, thereby preventing "the creation of true connections necessary to our understanding of the world". He sees them as no different from antipatterns in software design—as solutions that are false but are re-utilized nonetheless.

== Internet culture ==
An "Internet meme" is a concept that spreads rapidly from person to person via the Internet. Memes can spread from person to person via social networks, blogs, direct email, or news sources. Sending memes as a form of affection is known as pebbling.

In 2013, Dawkins characterized an Internet meme as one deliberately altered by human creativity, distinguished from his original idea involving mutation "by random change and a form of Darwinian selection".

Internet memes are an example of Dawkins' meme theory at work in the sense of how they so rapidly mirror current cultural events and become a part of how the time period is defined. Limor Shifman uses the example of the "Gangnam Style" music video by South Korean pop-star Psy that went viral in 2012. Shifman cites examples of how the meme mutated itself into the cultural sphere, mixing with other things going on at the time such as the 2012 U.S. presidential election, which led to the creation of "Mitt Romney Style", a parody of the original "Gangnam Style", intended to be a jab at the 2012 Republican presidential candidate, Mitt Romney.

=== Meme stocks ===
Meme stocks, a particular subset of Internet memes in general, are listed companies lauded for the social media buzz they create, rather than their operating performance. Meme stocks find themselves surging in popularity after gaining the interest of individuals or groups through the internet. r/wallstreetbets, a subreddit where participants discuss stock and option trading, and the financial services company Robinhood Markets, became notable in 2021 for their involvement on the popularization and enhancement of meme stocks. One of the most commonly recognized instances of a meme stock is GameStop, whose stocks saw a sudden increase after a Reddit-led idea to invest in 2021.

=== Meme coins ===
A meme coin (also spelled memecoin) is a cryptocurrency that originated from an internet meme or has some other humorous characteristic.

It may be used in the broadest sense as a critique of the cryptocurrency market in its entirety—those based on particular memes such as Dogecoin, celebrities like Coinye, and pump-and-dump schemes such as BitConnect—or it may be used to make cryptocurrency more accessible.

Meme coins derive their price primarily from social media momentum and celebrity association. Their prices can skyrocket rapidly as new investors, drawn by viral attention or fear of missing out (FOMO), pour in funds. However, this growth is typically unsustainable, as the price depends heavily on a continuous influx of new buyers. When interest wanes or new investment slows, meme coins frequently experience sharp price collapses, as there is little fundamental value to support their market capitalization, much like how Ponzi schemes rely on new capital to pay returns to earlier investors.

== Politics ==
As of early 2024, in the United States, the presidential campaigns have used memes on the Internet in the last three cycles. Disinformation has been charged by political contestants with memes being a concern of the complaints.

In Chagas et al. article about political memes, they look at how online memes have become an important part of politics, specifically in Brazil during the 2014 presidential election. The authors argue that memes are more than just silly jokes, they can also reflect the publics opinions and demonstrate how people feel about certain movements or candidates. The research is focused on how memes are spread through humor and culture, making some political content easier to understand. Memes can also help people to connect with others they share political ideals with. At times, politicians can even respond to or use memes in their campaign strategies. Some politicians will embrace the jokes, while others do not respond as well to the criticism. Overall, the article argues that memes are important in terms of modern political communication and go beyond just our entertainment.

== See also ==
- Baldwin effect
- The Beginning of Infinity
- Biosemiotics
- Chain letter
- Darwin machine
- Dual inheritance theory
- Evolutionary biology
- Framing (social sciences)
- Infodemic
- The Leiden school
- Memetic algorithm
- Memetic engineering
- Muslim meme
- Phraseme
- Propaganda
- Psycholinguistics
- Snowclone
- Survivals
- Universal Darwinism
- Viral marketing
- Viral video
