= Douglas MacArthur High School (San Antonio) =

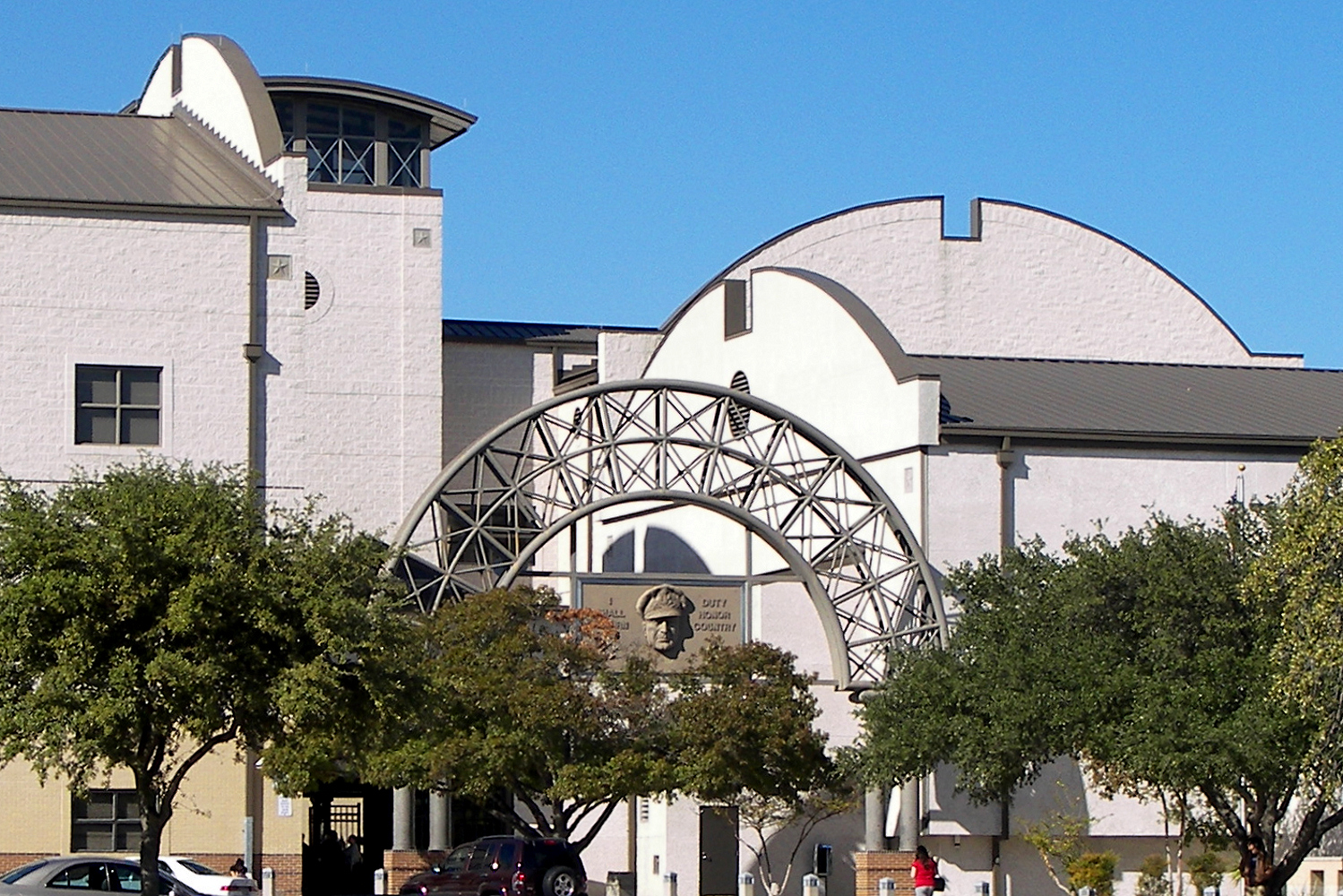

Location
- 2923 MacArthur View; San Antonio, Texas 78217; United States; 29°31′44″N 98°26′30″W

Information
- School type: Public, high school
- Motto: Fide et Opera (Latin for 'By Faith and Works')
- Founded: 1950; 76 years ago
- School district: North East ISD
- NCES School ID: 483294003646
- Principal: Joaquin Hernandez
- Teaching staff: 135.86 (FTE)
- Grades: 9–12
- Enrollment: 2,001 (2023–2024)
- Student to teacher ratio: 14.73
- Campus: Suburban
- Colors: Royal blue, white, and silver
- Athletics conference: UIL 5A Division I District 14-5A
- Mascot: Brahma
- Rivals: Churchill Chargers; Reagan Rattlers; Madison Mavericks
- Feeder schools: Garner, Driscoll and Bradley middle schools
- Website: macarthur.neisd.net

Douglas MacArthur High School (commonly MacArthur or Mac) is a public secondary school on the northeast side of San Antonio, Texas, United States. The school, a part of the North East Independent School District serves students in ninth grade through twelfth grade, with admission based primarily on the locations of students' homes. The school serves portions of San Antonio and the portion of Terrell Hills within NEISD. For the 2024–25 school year, the school was given a "C" by the Texas Education Agency.

== History ==
MacArthur High School was the first high school in the North East Independent School District. It was established in 1950 as North East Rural High School, but was later renamed after Douglas MacArthur in the 1958–1959 school year after the opening of Robert E. Lee High School (now named Legacy of Educational Excellence High School).

The campus was composed of separate academic buildings spread out over 37.8 acres until 1999 when the school underwent major construction. All buildings were demolished, except for the auditorium, cafeteria, and fine arts building, which were renovated. A new gymnasium was constructed, as well as a new main building, consisting of four wings, each three stories tall, with an open air courtyard in the center. The combining of the academic buildings allowed for the addition of several new athletic fields. The track at the school was renovated in the summer of 2008. Additional construction began in 2016 to construct a new Science and Athletics building. In 2018, the Fine Arts building began renovations and expansion.

The school's athletic and other organizations have seen many successes with district, regional, and state appearances and championships. The school has been recognized in recent years for its UIL Academic teams, with teams and individuals placing at the state level in science, current events, and social studies competitions, and a 2007 TMSCA State Championship in science. On a national level, MacArthur physics students have placed consistently in the top 15 in the JETS TEAMS Engineering Competition. The school was recognized as a National Blue Ribbon School in 1988–1989.

=== MacArthur letter ===
General Douglas MacArthur sent a letter to the school in January 1964 after a birthday celebration in his honor. The letter is located on the first floor in the administration department.

== Extracurricular activities ==
MacArthur hosted the first Texas French Symposium in 1964, and subsequently in 1965, 1966, 1970, 1971, 1974 and 1995.

Since its establishment in 1968, the MacArthur Blue Guard (MBG) varsity level armed drill team has represented MacArthur's Army Junior Reserve Officers Training Corps (J.R.O.T.C.) Battalion and MacArthur High School in U.S. Army platoon drill and exhibition. In 1990, MBG was named best armed drill team in the nation at the drill team championships in Daytona Beach, Florida. Four members from the Blue Guard also constitute the MacArthur High School's varsity Color Guard, who are responsible for presenting the colors at all home football games and competing in competitions around the state.

MacArthur's football team has made one appearance in the UIL State 5A Championship game in 1998. MacArthur had lost on December 12 to Katy High School, 14–6. However, Katy's win was forfeited for using an ineligible student during the regular season. Given hours to prepare, MacArthur played in the state title game but lost to Midland Lee 54–0.

MacArthur's baseball team reached the state finals in 1966 in Class 4A, the largest classification at the time. It lost to the Freeport Brazosport Exporters, 6–1. And again in 1987, the baseball team reached the state finals in the UIL Class 5A category, losing to Abilene Cooper, 13–3.

The boys' cross country team placed second behind Churchill in the district cross country meet on November 1, 2008. One runner from MacArthur placed third in the individual division at the district meet. The team finished in 14th place in the Region IV-Meet. One runner from the cross-country team qualified in the top 10 individual division to qualify for the Region IV meet on November 1, 2008.

MacArthur High School also has a very active fine arts program, including the marching band, known as "the Big Blue Marching Machine". The MacArthur marching band has stood for excellence for over 37 years. The band has a 27-year record of Superior UIL Sweepstake Awards in marching, concert and sight-reading. The band has been winners of major music contests in Texas, Florida, and California. The band won two State Marching Band Championships in Class 5A, one in 1985, and the other in 1986. In addition, the theater department at MacArthur High School has been outstanding for many years, and won the UIL One Act Theater competition for many years, under the leadership of Charles Jeffries, Luis Munoz, Jerry Knight, and Molly Risso. In 2014, the MacArthur OAP was the only school in NEISD to compete in the state UIL competition, finishing fourth in the state. MacArthur Theater was under the direction of Dean Whitus and Casey O'Bryant. In 2015, under the direction of Dean Whitus and Margaret Tonra, MacArthur was the only NEISD school to make it into the Area competition, and finished in third place and alternate for state competition.

In 2007, the Brahmadoras varsity dance team won the kick category at NDA nationals in Orlando, Florida.

In 2009, the varsity cheerleaders won the Universal Cheerleaders Association National Championship in the Small Varsity category.

In 2010, the varsity football team won the title of District Champions.

In March 2015, the Lassies junior varsity dance team won the nationals in the Pom category at NDA Nationals in Orlando, Florida.

In 2015, the MacArthur Winter Guard won 1st place in Scholastic A Class at the TCGC Championships in College Station, Texas. Throughout the season, they had won first place at every competition. Their show was entitled "Lose Yourself".

In April 2018, the MacArthur Indoor Percussion marching ensemble competed, for the first time in the school's history, at the Winter Guard International World Championship in Dayton, Ohio. The group, performing their production titled "A Show of Hands," placed 14th overall in their respective Scholastic Marching Open category.

== TAP ==
TAP MacArthur High School houses the Electrical Systems Technology Program for students interested in pursuing a career in the electrical industry. Established as a Technical Apprenticeship Program (TAP) in conjunction with the United States Department of Labor, Bureau of Apprenticeship and Training, this program provides students with practical experience and industry certifications while still in high school.

Students earn apprenticeship hours toward professional certification and licensure requirements. The curriculum covers residential, commercial, and industrial wiring, along with training on state, local, and national electrical codes. Hands-on projects and theoretical instruction prepare students for employment or further education.

The TAP has strong partnerships with local electrical contractors, offering pathways to employment upon graduation. Many graduates have found careers with companies like Five Point Electric and Calcote Electric. The program has also produced numerous SkillsUSA state champions over the years, with students excelling in regional and national competitions. Hunter Bakel, a standout participant, was a three-time state champion from 2010 to 2012 and won third place nationally in SkillsUSA Residential Wiring in 2011. Many other students have followed in his footsteps becoming state champions and advancing in their electrical careers, such as David Navarro, who won 1st place nationally for Industrial Motor Controls.

Between 2019 and 2020, the Electrical Systems Technology Program was relocated to a new and better-equipped facility at the Career and Technical Education Center (CTEC), just down the road from MacArthur High School.

== Notable alumni ==
=== Science ===
John David Crawford (Class of 1972) – late physicist and professor at the University of Pittsburgh

=== Athletics ===
- Jace Amaro (Class of 2011) – former NFL player (tight end) for the Kansas City Chiefs
- David Bailiff (Class of 1976) – college football coach, most recently the head coach at Rice University, 2007–2017
- Keith Edmonson (Class of 1978) – NBA player (point guard)
- John Gibbons (Class of 1980) – former MLB professional baseball player, current manager of the Toronto Blue Jays
- Jerry Grote (Class of 1961) – former MLB professional baseball player And World Series catcher with the New York Mets
- Jace Jung (Class of 2019) – MLB third baseman for the Detroit Tigers
- Josh Jung (Class of 2016) – MLB third baseman for the Texas Rangers
- Clint Killough (Class of 2011) – current head football coach for the University of the Incarnate Word
- Jason Szuminski (Class of 1997) – former MLB professional baseball player
- Jason Washington (Class of 1998) – current assistant football coach for the University of South Alabama

=== Government ===
- Randolph Alles (Class of 1972) – retired United States Marine Corps major general and former director of the United States Secret Service
- Dan Branch (Class of 1976) – former member of the Texas House of Representatives, and current Dallas attorney.
- Robert T. Clark (Class of 1966) – retired United States Army lieutenant general
- Lyle Larson (Class of 1977) – member of the Texas House of Representatives, from District 122

=== Art and film ===
- David Crabb (Class of 1994) – storyteller, actor, and author
- Terri Hendrix (Class of 1986) – singer-songwriter, independent record label owner, activist
- Terra Jolé (Class of 1998) – reality TV star
- Kirk Lynn (Class of 1990) – playwright
- Bruce McGill (Class of 1968) – actor
- Don Mischer (Class of 1958) – television producer
- Norah O'Donnell (Class of 1991) – co-anchor of CBS This Morning
- Deborah Paredez (Class of 1989) – poet and academic
- Robert Wright (Class of 1975) – author of The Moral Animal, Nonzero, and The Evolution of God

=== Business ===
- John Lilly (Class of 1989) – venture capitalist and former CEO of the Mozilla Corporation from 2008 to 2010
