= Human zoo (disambiguation) =

A human zoo is a public exhibition of humans.

Human Zoo may also refer to:

== Music ==
- Human Zoo (Gotthard album), 2003, or the title track
- Human Zoo (Electric Six album), 2014
- "Human Zoo", a 2018 song by Boy George and Culture Club from the 2018 album Life

== Other uses ==
- The Human Zoo (book), a 1969 book by Desmond Morris
- The Human Zoo (radio), a UK radio programme presented by Tommy Boyd
- Human Zoo (film), a 2009 film by Rie Rasmussen
- The Human Zoo, a reality television series with psychologist Philip Zimbardo
