= Zen and the Art of Consciousness =

Book by Susan Blackmore

- Author: Susan Blackmore
- Original title: Ten Zen Questions
- Subject: Consciousness
- Publisher: Oneworld Publications
- Publication date: 2011
- Pages: 208
- ISBN: 978-1851687985 (reprint edition)

Zen and the Art of Consciousness (2011), originally titled Ten Zen Questions (2009), is a book by Susan Blackmore. It describes her thoughts during zazen retreats and other self-directed meditative exercises, and how those thoughts relate to the neuroscience of consciousness. Most chapters in the book center around a Zen question and describe Blackmore's inner monologue contemplating the question's implications for subjective experience. The final chapter features a response by Blackmore's Zen teacher.

== Summary ==
Blackmore regards her book as an "attempt to see whether looking directly into one's own mind can contribute to a science of consciousness."

Blackmore practices Zen, although she is not a Buddhist herself. Rather, "I am someone with a questioning mind who has stumbled upon Zen and found it immensely helpful." Some of Blackmore's questions are not strictly Zen but rather come from Mahamudra traditions, though she got them from a Zen instructor, John Crook.

Blackmore's discussion revolves around ten questions, discussed in the following sections.

=== 1. Am I conscious now? ===
Blackmore asks herself, "Am I conscious now?" and answers "Of course I am. Yes, I am conscious now." But she feels as though by asking the question, she has in a sense "awakened" herself, which leads her to wonder if she was conscious just before asking. She repeatedly asks herself the question, each time saying "yes". As she continues asking it over the years, the "waking up" experience becomes more gradual. Likewise, asking the question all the time becomes easier, and eventually, "The words aren't really necessary any more. Rather, there just seems to be a questioning attitude, an openness of mind."

=== 2. What was I conscious of a moment ago? ===
Blackmore tries to figure out what she was conscious of just beforehand. When she asks, she can remember many sensations—for instance, the wood floor and the cat's purr. It seems as though she had been aware of them for a while back in time, yet she only seemed to "notice" them when she thought about the question. Likewise, Blackmore thinks about her breath, which "is always there", but she's not sure if she was watching it prior to asking the question.

Blackmore is skeptical of current efforts to find neural correlates of consciousness because "if I don't know which sights and sounds I was conscious of, and which I was not, then this whole line of scientific research must be entirely misguided."

=== 3. Who is asking the question? ===
Blackmore probes who "she" is. One approach is to find "a boundary, or edge, or divide" between what she's looking at and the person doing the looking. For instance, noticing a twist of her hair, she asks, "Am I this side of the hair and the experiences the other? No. That’s silly." She tries to trace a path from the external world through to herself, but she can never find herself. "Look for the viewing self and find only the view. I am, it seems, the world I see."

=== 4. Where is this? ===
Blackmore observes flowers and asks where resides the experience of them—e.g., their yellowness. Clearly it's not in the flowers themselves because, for instance, what looks yellow to Blackmore would look different to a bee with a very different visual system. Another option is that the color is represented by a pattern of neural firing in her visual cortex, but it's not clear why that neural activity is "yellow itself".

=== 5. How does thought arise? ===
Blackmore reflects on the nature of "abiding in tranquillity and moving in thought." She notices that her thoughts can seem to take on "parallel threads". Some thoughts "happen right here, in the midst of tranquillity" while others are more active. The latter "drag part of the mind away" and split it in two. Blackmore envisions this "as a theory about what is happening in the brain, with groups of neurons organising themselves in different places, their patterns arising and falling away, though with no experiencing self."

=== 6. There is no time. What is memory? ===
Blackmore asks whether time exists. She thinks about the present, past, future, and imaginary things. She realizes that "Although I can label them differently, and they vary in vividness and how much confidence I have in their details, they all seemed to be made of the same kind of stuff."

=== 7. When are you? ===
Blackmore recounts experiences during mindfulness when she felt as though she could "leap off into nothingness" and briefly not exist. She feels as though events in the world arise from nothingness, "springing up out of no-place and no-time".

=== 8. Are you here now? ===
Blackmore considers the metaphor of "life as a string of beads" and rejects it because her mind seems to contain "many streams" of experience that "arise and fall away, their observers coming and going with them." Her reflection leads her to agree with Daniel Dennett's critique of the Cartesian theater. Instead her experience is closer to Dennett's multiple-drafts model. She also feels how to be her own thoughts, reminiscent of William James's view that "thought is itself the thinker, and psychology need not look beyond".

=== 9. What am I doing? ===
Blackmore explores the absence of free will in a causally closed universe. After having pondered the problem for a long time, Blackmore's sense of free will faded:

This seems to be all that happens; decisions are made because of countless interacting events, and afterwards a little voice inside says "I did that", "I decided to do that".

Still, Blackmore learned during a Zen retreat that she could take responsibility. Once a decision was made, "That's what happened, these are the consequences. Things just are the way they are."

=== 10. What next? ===
Blackmore explores questions of reincarnation, self-continuity, and "the timeless, emptiness, or void, or whatever it is, out of which phenomena appear."

== Reactions ==
Steven Poole said Blackmore writes "in a style that is deliberately fragmentary, a succession of false starts or paths petering out into nothingness (which may also be the point)." He compared some parts to "a surreal existential horror novel".

Jenny Doe noted that Blackmore's prose "is not always up to the job of capturing the profundity and mystery of the Zen experience, and occasionally ends up reminiscent of the ramblings of a stoned student." That said, Doe feels the book is a great starting point for laypeople to explore philosophy of mind.

Anthony Freeman welcomed Blackmore's investigation of conscious experience. He recommended reading the book "slowly and reflectively" because of its dense meditative tone. "The reading becomes a reliving of the experience."

Peter Fenwick noted how Blackmore's views on the self as a construction make sense of her previous work arguing that near-death experiences are also a construction of the mind. He feels the book "should be compulsory reading for anyone in consciousness studies and certainly on every psychology course" and that if more scientists introspected as Blackmore does, "consciousness research would follow an entirely different and more progressive path."

Bodhipaksa calls Blackmore's "an extraordinary book: a sometimes heady but deeply rewarding read." He notes how Blackmore's discussion parallels some classic ideas from Buddhism, including the distinction between awareness and awareness of awareness. Bodhipaksa criticizes Blackmore's inference from becoming aware of sounds that happened in the past to assuming that her consciousness of them is "an attribution made later" because he points out that sounds can persist in echoic memory for 4 seconds: "A lot of Blackmore's descriptions of mindfulness seem to have involved paying attention to what’s in echoic memory rather than what she was currently listening to." Finally, Bodhipaksa notes that some of Blackmore's use of terminology was loose and may reflect "a 'feeling' of significance that hasn't been fully thought out or articulated."

Aaron Sloman found Blackmore's book to be "an excellent read if you have the right kind of interest and the right kind of patience." He found the book valuable as an account of what it feels like to be puzzled "about consciousness, freedom, self, the relationships between mind and brain," but he said it fails to consider the standpoint of designing a thinking system and therefore misses out on useful insights. He feels "the attempt to understand consciousness simply by gazing inwardly at it can have limited success." It might be "like trying to make the trace-printing portion of a debugging package trace itself." Sloman also feels that Blackmore's rejection of "contents of consciousness", "the self", and "free will" are based too much on confused notions of what those things mean, and "she has not considered the right sorts of explanations" for those concepts. Nevertheless, Sloman thinks Zen and the Art of Consciousness "may become a classic because of the unique combination of qualities the author brings to it."

== See also ==
- Hard problem of consciousness
- Ego death
- Consciousness Explained by Daniel Dennett
- Waking Up: A Guide to Spirituality Without Religion by Sam Harris
- Why Buddhism is True by Robert Wright
- Altered Traits: Science Reveals How Meditation Changes Your Mind, Brain, and Body by Daniel Goleman and Richard Davidson
