= The Naked Ape =

Book by Desmond Morris

- First edition cover (Jonathan Cape, 1967)
- Author: Desmond Morris
- Language: English
- Genre: Anthropology
- Publisher: McGraw-Hill
- Publication date: 1967
- ISBN: 9780070431744

The Naked Ape: A Zoologist's Study of the Human Animal is a 1967 book by English zoologist and ethologist Desmond Morris that looks at humans as a species and compares them to other animals. The Human Zoo, a follow-up book by Morris that examined the behaviour of people in cities, was published in 1969.

== Summary ==
The Naked Ape, which was serialised in the Daily Mirror newspaper and has been translated into 23 languages, depicts human behaviour as largely evolved to meet the challenges of prehistoric life as a hunter. The book was so named because out of 193 species of monkeys and apes, only humans (Homo sapiens sapiens) are not covered in hair. Desmond Morris, the author, who had been the curator of mammals at London Zoo, said his book was intended to popularise and demystify science.

Morris said that Homo sapiens not only have the largest brains of all higher primates, but that sexual selection in human evolution has caused humans to have the highest ratio of penis size to body mass. Morris conjectured that human ear-lobes developed as an additional erogenous zone to facilitate the extended sexuality necessary in the evolution of human monogamous pair bonding. Morris further stated that the more rounded shape of human female breasts means they are mainly a sexual signalling device rather than simply for providing milk for infants.

Morris framed many features of human behaviour in the context of evolution at a time when cultural explanations were more orthodox. For example, Morris wrote that the intense human pair bond evolved so that men who were out hunting could trust that their mates back home were not having sex with other men, and suggested the possibility that sparse body hair evolved because the "nakedness" helped intensify pair bonding by increasing tactile pleasure.

== Film adaptations ==
A 1973 film directed by Donald Driver, very loosely based on the book, was made starring Johnny Crawford and Victoria Principal. In 2006, an independent film was made, based loosely on the book, written and directed by Daniel Mellitz, starring Josh Wise, Chelse Swain, Sean Shanks, Amanda MacDonald, Tony LaThanh, and Corbin Bernsen. Beyond their scripts being loosely based on his book, Morris was not involved in either film.

== Bibliography ==
- The Naked Ape: A Zoologist's Study of the Human Animal (hardback: ISBN 0070431744; reprint: ISBN 0385334303); Jonathan Cape Publishing, 1967
- Corgi Books paperback editions, 1967, 1968, 1969
- Dell Publishing edition, 1969
- The Illustrated Naked Ape: A Zoologist's Study of the Human Animal, Jonathan Cape Publishing, 1987 (reviewed by Janet Dunaif-Hattis in American Anthropologist, vol. 89, mo. 3, pp. 732–733, September 1987)
- Vintage Books; new (revised) edition, 2005; ISBN 0099482010

Critical response

- John Lewis, B. Towers, Naked Ape or Homo sapiens?: Reply to Desmond Morris. Teilhard Study Library, 1969; ISBN 0900391219

== Criticism ==
In 1976, anthropologists Adrienne Zihlman and Nancy Tanner criticized The Naked Ape for being sexist. Writing for The Observer in 2017, science journalist Angela Saini said, "His consistent failure to understand the impact of patriarchy and female repression bordered on the bizarre." She points out that he chooses to erase hunter-gatherer societies from his analysis (despite those societies being closest to how humans evolved), claims that women have been mostly house-bound for all time, and claims that work is a predominantly male pursuit. Author and presenter of Radio 4's Inside Science, Adam Rutherford, called the book "erotic fantasy science" and "a book full of exciting ideas that have little scientific validity." Sociologist Stanislav Andreski, in his book Social Sciences as Sorcery (pp 151–152) referred to it as pseudoscience that "provides an uneducated public...with rather childish pornography".

== Censorship ==
In the United States, in February 1976, the book was removed from high school library shelves by the board of education of the Island Trees Union Free School District in New York. (Note: The Naked Ape was one of nine books in the school library that were determined to be "improper fare for school students" and removed from shelves. The others were Slaughterhouse-Five by Kurt Vonnegut Jr.; Down These Mean Streets by Piri Thomas; The Best Short Stories of Negro Writers, edited by Langston Hughes; Go Ask Alice, of anonymous authorship; Laughing Boy by Oliver La Farge; Black Boy by Richard Wright; A Hero Ain't Nothin' but a Sandwich by Alice Childress; and Soul on Ice by Eldridge Cleaver.) This case became the subject of a U.S. Supreme Court case in 1982.

== Cultural impact ==
The book is mentioned in the Italian entry for the 2017 Eurovision Song Contest "Occidentali's Karma" by Francesco Gabbani, in which most of the lyrics contain philosophical references. The lyricist had read The Naked Ape himself. Morris, "fascinated by the culture, beauty and richness" of the references to his theories, sent Gabbani a signed copy of the Italian translation of the book as a sign of gratitude and support for the latter.

== See also ==
- Charles Darwin
- Evolutionary psychology
- Sociobiology
- The Territorial Imperative, 1966 book by Robert Ardrey
- The Moral Animal, 1994 book by Robert Wright

== Notes and references ==
Notes
