= RISK! =

Storytelling podcast

Presentation
- Hosted by: Kevin Allison
- Genre: Storytelling
- Language: English
- Updates: Every Monday
- Length: 30–60 minutes

Production
- Production: Kevin Allison; Jeff Barr; JC Cassis; John LaSala

Publication
- Original release: August 6, 2009 (Live show); October 2009 (Podcast)

RISK! is a weekly podcast and live storytelling show created and hosted by writer, actor, and storyteller Kevin Allison. The show's official website describes RISK! as a place "where people tell true stories they never thought they'd dare to share in public". RISK! started as a weekly live storytelling series in August 2009. Chris Castiglione and Jeff Barr joined in 2010 as part of the founding team. JC Cassis joined the production team in 2011.

As of 2018, the podcast was averaging 1 million downloads a month.

== Format ==
Each episode of the RISK! podcast starts with an introduction from Kevin Allison. In his introduction, Allison updates listeners about upcoming events that relate to the show and he also introduces that week's theme. Past themes include "Unintended," "New At This," and "Met on the Net."

The show then continues with theme-based first-person narratives, both humorous and serious. RISK! initially focused on stories from celebrity guests but moved to incorporate more stories from everyday people, told with behind the scenes coaching from Allison and his team. The stories from the podcast are usually a combination of material from Kevin Allison, the live show, listener submissions and work from The Story Studio, the storytelling school that the RISK! team created. These stories are often followed by interstitial music or sound collages created by the RISK! team or listeners.

RISK! is known for featuring stories that defy social taboos, such as stories about sex and traumatic events. RISK! stories can be humorous, scary, or tear-jerking. Some stories can be explicit and come with content warnings beforehand. The show has featured many storytellers with LGBTQ or other minority identities.

== Live shows ==
The live version of RISK! debuted as a weekly show at Arlene's Grocery in New York City on August 6, 2009. The theme of the premiere show was "Strange Sex: Our Wildest Encounters" and featured stories from Marc Maron, Jessi Klein, Margot Leitman, Jonathan Kesselman, and was hosted by Kevin Allison. The weekly show moved to Joe's Pub in October 2009. Featured performers at the Joe's Pub performances include Margaret Cho, Rachel Dratch, Andy Borowitz and Janeane Garofalo.

In 2010, RISK! began monthly live shows in both New York City and Los Angeles. The New York shows are hosted by Kevin Allison, and the shows in Los Angeles are hosted by David Crabb. Currently, live shows can be seen at Caveat in New York City or at various venues in Los Angeles.

Other notable live guests have included Kurt Metzger, Trevor Noah, Samantha Bee, Bowen Yang, Julio Torres, Ilana Glazer, Dan Savage, Sasheer Zamata, Joe Lo Truglio, Kumail Nanjiani, John Hodgman, Jenny Slate, Maria Bamford and Eric Andre.

=== On tour ===
The RISK! live show frequently tours around the US as well, with occasional international dates. Kevin Allison hosted a live show during SXSW in Austin, Texas in 2012. The live show has traveled across the United States including to Chicago, Illinois, Seattle, Washington, Portland, Oregon, Dallas, Houston and Austin, Texas, Atlanta, Georgia, Brown University and over 40 other cities in the USA, Canada and UK.

=== Online shows ===
When live events were shut down due to the COVID-19 pandemic in March 2020, RISK! moved to an online show format to continue supporting its staff of 20 including six full-time employees. Storytellers broadcast from their homes and 400-600 guests tuned in for each online show.

== RISK! book ==
In 2018, the book RISK!: True Stories People Never Thought They’d Dare To Share was released, featuring 37 stories of defining moments in the tellers' lives, 31 of which are popular stories from the podcast and six are bonus stories. Storytellers in the book include Aisha Tyler, Marc Maron, Michael Ian Black, Lili Taylor, Ts Madison, Dan Savage, Jonah Ray, and Jesse Thorn.
