= Evan Thompson =

Canadian professor of philosophy (born 1962)

Evan Timothy Thompson
- Born: November 1962 (age 63–64)
- Spouse: Rebecca Todd

Academic background
- Education: Amherst College (AB 1983), University of Toronto (PhD 1990)
- Thesis: Colour Vision and the Comparative Argument, A Case Study in Cognitive Science and the Philosophy of Perception (1990)

Academic work
- Institutions: University of British Columbia
- Main interests: Asian Philosophy, Philosophy of mind, Cognitive Science
- Website: https://evanthompson.me/

Evan Timothy Thompson (born November 1, 1962) is a professor of philosophy at the University of British Columbia, specializing in cognitive science, phenomenology, philosophy of mind, and cross-cultural philosophy, particularly Buddhist philosophy in dialogue with Western philosophy of mind and cognitive science.

== Life ==
As a child, Thompson was home-schooled at the Lindisfarne Association, a think tank and retreat founded by his father, William Irwin Thompson. In 1977, Thompson met Chilean phenomenologist Francisco Varela when Varela attended a Lindisfarne conference which was organized by Thompson Senior and Gregory Bateson. Thompson received a Ph.D. in philosophy from the University of Toronto in 1990 and an A.B. in Asian studies from Amherst College in 1983.

== Career ==
Thompson has taught at the University of Toronto, Concordia University, Boston University, and York University. While at York University, Thompson was also a member of the Centre for Vision Research. Thompson has held visiting appointments at the Center for Subjectivity Research in Copenhagen, and at the University of Colorado, Boulder. Thompson worked with Francisco Varela at CREA (Centre de Recherche en Epistemologie Appliquée) at the Ecole Polytechnique in Paris. During this time, Varela and Thompson, along with Eleanor Rosch, wrote The Embodied Mind: Cognitive Science and Human Experience, which introduced the approach to cognitive science known as enactivism. Thompson's book, Mind in Life: Biology, Phenomenology, and the Sciences of Mind, argues for a deep continuity between life and mind. In 2015, Thompson published Waking, Dreaming, Being: Self and Consciousness in Neuroscience, Meditation, and Philosophy . In this work, he combines insights from neuroscience, meditation and philosophy with his own biographical background and personal storytelling, including encounters with F. Varela and the 14th Dalai Lama. Based on his theory that direct experience plays a primary role, Thompson advocates for the development of a contemplative neuroscience.

In 2020, Thompson published Why I Am Not A Buddhist, which argues against what he calls Buddhist exceptionalism, "the belief that Buddhism is superior to other religions...or that Buddhism isn't really a religion but rather is a kind of 'mind science,' therapy, philosophy, or a way of life based on meditation."

== Works ==
- Francisco Varela, Evan Thompson, and Eleanor Rosch, The Embodied Mind: Cognitive Science and Human Experience. MIT Press, 1991.
- Colour Vision: A Study in Cognitive Science and the Philosophy of Perception Routledge Press, 1995
- Between Ourselves: Second Person Issues in the Study of Consciousness. Imprint Academic, 2001. Published also as a special triple issue of the Journal of Consciousness Studies
- Alva Noe and Evan Thompson, eds., Vision and Mind: Selected Readings in the Philosophy of Perception. MIT Press, 2002.
- The Problem of Consciousness: New Essays in Phenomenological Philosophy of Mind. Canadian Journal of Philosophy, Supplementary Volume 29: 2003. University of Alberta Press
- Giovanna Colombetti and Evan Thompson, eds., Emotion Experience. Imprint Academic, 2005. Published also as a special triple issue of the Journal of Consciousness Studies
- The Cambridge Handbook of Consciousness. Edited by Philip David Zelazo, Morris Moscovitch, Evan Thompson, May 2007 Cambridge University Press: Cambridge Handbooks in Psychology series, ISBN 978-0-521-67412-6
- Mind in Life: Biology, Phenomenology, and the Sciences of Mind. Harvard University Press, 2010, ISBN 978-0-674-05751-7
- Waking, Dreaming, Being: Self and Consciousness in Neuroscience, Meditation, and Philosophy. Columbia University Press, 2014, ISBN 978-0-231-13709-6
- Why I am Not a Buddhist. Yale University Press, 2020 ISBN 978-0-300-22655-3
- Co-written with Adam Frank and Marcelo Gleiser, The Blind Spot: Why Science Cannot Ignore Human Experience, MIT Press, 2024, ISBN 978-0-262-04880-4

== See also ==
- Embodied mind
- Tukdam
- Waking Up: A Guide to Spirituality Without Religion by Sam Harris
- Why Buddhism is True by Robert Wright
- Secular Buddhism
