= Why Buddhism Is True =

2017 book by Robert Wright

Why Buddhism is True: The Science and Philosophy of Meditation and Enlightenment
- Author: Robert Wright
- Language: English
- Subject: Buddhism
- Publisher: Simon & Schuster
- Publication date: August 8, 2017
- Publication place: United States
- Media type: Print (hardcover and paperback)
- Pages: 336 (hardcover)
- ISBN: 978-1-4391-9545-1 (Hardcover)
- Preceded by: The Evolution of God

Why Buddhism is True: The Science and Philosophy of Meditation and Enlightenment is a 2017 book by Robert Wright. As of August 2017, the book had peaked at The New York Times No. 4 bestseller in hardcover nonfiction.

== Content ==
In Why Buddhism is True, Wright advocates a secular, Westernized form of Buddhism focusing on the practice of mindfulness meditation and stripped of supernatural beliefs such as reincarnation. He further argues that more widespread practice of meditation could lead to a more reflective and empathetic population and reduce political tribalism. In line with his background, Wright draws heavily on evolutionary biology and evolutionary psychology to defend Buddhism's diagnosis of the causes of human suffering. He argues that the modern psychological idea of the modularity of mind resonates with the Buddhist teaching of no-self (anatman).

== Reception ==
Why Buddhism is True received a number of positive reviews from major publications. The neuroscientist Antonio Damasio, reviewing the book in The New York Times, wrote, "Wright's book is provocative, informative and, in many respects, deeply rewarding." Kirkus Reviews called the book a "cogent and approachable argument for a personal meditation practice based on secular Buddhist principles." Adam Frank, writing for National Public Radio, called it "delightfully personal, yet broadly important".

There were also mixed reviews. Adam Gopnik wrote in The New Yorker that he respected Wright's candor and the reported benefits of his meditative practice, but remained skeptical that any strictly secularized (i.e. stripped of all supernaturality) form of traditional religion could be a compelling enough belief system in the long run. The Washington Post wrote that while Wright "does not make a fully convincing case for some of his more grandiose claims about truth and freedom, his argument contains many interesting and illuminating points."

In 2020, Evan Thompson questioned what he called Buddhist exceptionalism, "the belief that Buddhism is superior to other religions... or that Buddhism isn't really a religion but rather is a kind of 'mind science,' therapy, philosophy, or a way of life based on meditation." Thompson questioned both Wright's version of secularized and naturalized Buddhism and, conversely, Wright's conception of evolutionary psychology that Wright claims Buddhism is uniquely equipped to address.

== See also ==
- Waking Up: A Guide to Spirituality Without Religion by Sam Harris
- Zen and the Art of Consciousness by Susan Blackmore
- Altered Traits: Science Reveals How Meditation Changes Your Mind, Brain, and Body by Daniel Goleman and Richard Davidson
- Stephen Batchelor (author)
- Joseph Goldstein (writer)
- Sharon Salzberg
- Shinzen Young
- Jon Kabat-Zinn
- Judson A. Brewer
- Bhikkhu Bodhi
