= Waking Up: A Guide to Spirituality Without Religion =

2014 book by Sam Harris

- Author: Sam Harris
- Language: English
- Subject: Spirituality
- Publisher: Simon & Schuster
- Publication date: September 9, 2014
- Publication place: United States
- Media type: Print (hardcover and paperback)
- Pages: 256 (hardcover)
- ISBN: 978-1451636017
- Preceded by: Free Will
- Followed by: Islam and the Future of Tolerance

Excerpt from Waking Up read by Sam Harris on his podcast.

Waking Up: A Guide to Spirituality Without Religion is a 2014 book by Sam Harris that discusses a wide range of topics including secular spirituality (essentially within the context of spiritual naturalism), the illusion of the self, psychedelics, and meditation. He attempts to show that a certain form of spirituality is integral to understanding the nature of the mind. In late September 2014, the book reached #5 on The New York Times Non-Fiction Best Sellers list.

In September 2018 Harris released a meditation app entitled "Waking Up with Sam Harris." Harris' podcast had previously been titled Waking Up, but he retitled it Making Sense to differentiate it from his meditation app.

== Content ==
=== Role of spirituality ===
Harris rejects the dichotomy between spirituality and rationality, and seeks to define a middle path that preserves spirituality and science but does not involve religion. He writes that spirituality should be understood in light of scientific disciplines like neuroscience and psychology. Science, he contends, can show how to maximize human well-being but may fail to answer certain questions about the nature of being, answers to some of which he says are discoverable directly through our experience. His conception of spirituality does not involve a belief in God.

Harris' treatment of the nature of the mind draws on psychology, split-brain scientific literature, and philosophy of mind. He explores various positions on the mind-body problem but states that the solution may lie beyond the capabilities of human reason.

Harris writes that the purpose of spirituality (as he defines it – he says the term's uses are diverse and sometimes indefensible) is to become aware that our sense of self is illusory, and says that this realization brings both happiness and insight into the nature of consciousness. He says spiritual discipline allows us to repeatedly recognize in our day-to-day lives that there is no self. Instead, there is an apprehension of "pure consciousness," a profoundly peaceful state independent of any sense experience. He argues this process of realization is based on experience and is not contingent on faith.

=== Meditation and experiences ===
Harris provides brief guidance on how to meditate, and directs readers to his website for more in-depth instructions. He has studied under several Eastern meditation teachers, and gives advice on how to identify a good spiritual teacher. He describes his experience with Dzogchen, a Tibetan Buddhist practice, and recommends it to his readers.

Although Harris assigns great value to religious experiences, he argues that facts about the cosmos and particular religious dogmas cannot reasonably be inferred from these experiences. In this vein, he describes some of his own deep spiritual experiences, but does not interpret them as evidence, for instance, of Christian, Hindu, or Buddhist metaphysics, as he says adherents of those religions likely would. He defends a segment of English spiritual author Douglas Harding's book On Having No Head against the sharp criticisms of cognitive scientist Douglas Hofstadter. By contrast, he criticizes Eben Alexander's Christian interpretation of a near-death experience in Proof of Heaven at length as filled with unwarranted assumptions.

== Reception ==
Waking Up has been praised by critics. Frank Bruni of The New York Times wrote, "Harris's book [...] caught my eye because it's so entirely of this moment, so keenly in touch with the growing number of Americans who are willing to say that they do not find the succor they crave, or a truth that makes sense to them, in organized religion." He notes that since publishing The End of Faith in 2004, Harris has shifted focus to some extent from criticizing religion to trying to understand what people seek in religion and arguing these benefits are possible without it.

Stephen Cave of the Financial Times similarly described Waking Up as "a fine book" and observed, "although it portrays only a fragment of the emerging picture of post-Christian spirituality, it nonetheless does so with great colour and clarity – like a shining stained glass window for a church that is still being built." Kirkus Reviews called it "A demanding, illusion-shattering book certain to receive criticism from both the scientific and the religious camps." Peter Clothier, writing for the Huffington Post, described it as "an immensely readable and enjoyable book. Harris writes about the profound issues that affect our lives with clarity, and with occasional humor."

It received a more mixed response from Trevor Quirk of The New Republic, who criticized what he perceived as the book's inconsistencies and Harris's willingness to belittle religious people. He nevertheless wrote, "[Harris's] new book, whether discussing the poverty of spiritual language, the neurophysiology of consciousness, psychedelic experience, or the quandaries of the self, at the very least acknowledges the potency and importance of the religious impulse—though Harris might name it differently—that fundamental and common instinct to seek not just an answer to life, but a way to live that answer." Likewise, the Washington Independent Review of Books' Holly Smith writes, "Overall, Harris’ book has much to recommend it, but not so much that it should be anyone's first stop on the road to secular spirituality."

== See also ==
- Why Buddhism is True by Robert Wright
- Altered Traits: Science Reveals How Meditation Changes Your Mind, Brain, and Body by Daniel Goleman and Richard Davidson
- How to Change Your Mind by Michael Pollan
- Zen and the Art of Consciousness by Susan Blackmore
- Secular Buddhism
- Buddhism and psychology
- Joseph Goldstein (writer)
- Hard problem of consciousness
- New mysterianism
