= Beyond the Body: An Investigation of Out-of-the-Body Experiences =

Book

Beyond the Body: An Investigation of Out-of-the-Body Experiences is a book written by Dr. Susan Blackmore and published in 1983.

== Contents ==
Beyond the Body is a book that takes a critical view of out-of-body experiences.

== Reception ==
Dave Langford reviewed Beyond the Body for White Dwarf #47, and stated that "Blackmore decides that almost certainly OBEs are subjective, abnormal psychological states - raising fascinating questions about similarities between experiences, even those of obscure tribes. Could they be a consequence of the 'wiring' of the brains? Also included is much analysis of case histories and the theories of (eg) Theosophists."
