= George Johnson (writer) =

American journalist and science writer (born 1952)

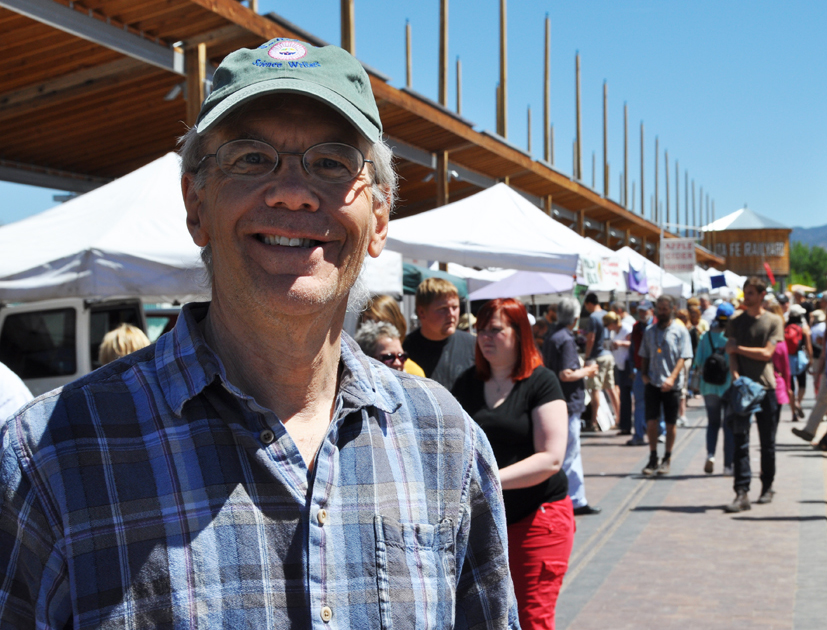
- Born: January 20, 1952 (age 74); Fayetteville, Arkansas, U.S.
- Education: University of New Mexico (BA); American University (MA)
- Occupations: Science writer, journalist
- Notable credit(s): Writer for The New York Times; author of several books
- Website: http://talaya.net

George Johnson (born January 20, 1952) is an American journalist and science writer.

== Work ==
Johnson is the author of nine books, including The Cancer Chronicles (2013), The Ten Most Beautiful Experiments (2008) and Strange Beauty: Murray Gell-Mann and the Revolution in 20th-Century Physics (1999), and writes for a number of publications, including The New York Times. He is a two-time winner of the science journalism award from the American Association for the Advancement of Science. His books have been short-listed three times for the Royal Society science book prize. His column, "Raw Data", appeared in The New York Times from 2014 to 2016.

Johnson was one of the co-hosts (with science writer John Horgan) of "Science Faction", a weekly discussion on the website Bloggingheads.tv, related to topics in science. Several prominent scientists, philosophers, and bloggers have been interviewed for the site.

== Awards ==
His ninth book The Cancer Chronicles: Unlocking Medicine's Deepest Mystery was on the shortlist for the 2014 Royal Society Prize for Science Books.

Previously shortlisted for the prize were Strange Beauty: Murray Gell-Mann and the Revolution in 20th-Century Physics (2001) and Fire in the Mind: Science, Faith, and the Search for Order (1995).

In 2014 three of his pieces for The New York Times about the science of cancer won the AAAS Science Journalism Award. He won the award in 2000 for three articles about complexity and high-energy physics.

== Bibliography ==
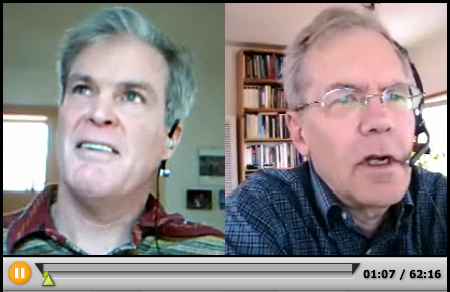
Johnson & John Horgan on a "Science Saturday" (later called "Science Faction") episode of Bloggingheads.tv

- The Cancer Chronicles: Unlocking Medicine's Deepest Mystery. Knopf, 2013. Vintage paperback, 2014.
- The Ten Most Beautiful Experiments. Knopf, 2008. Vintage paperback, 2009.
- Miss Leavitt's Stars: The Untold Story of the Woman Who Discovered How to Measure the Universe. James Atlas Books/Norton, 2005. Norton paperback 2006, about Henrietta Leavitt
- A Shortcut Through Time: The Path to the Quantum Computer. Knopf, 2003. Vintage paperback, 2004.
- Strange Beauty: Murray Gell-Mann and the Revolution in 20th-Century Physics. Knopf, 1999. Vintage paperback, 2000. Second edition, 2023, SFI Press, about Murray Gell-Mann
- Fire in the Mind: Science, Faith, and the Search for Order. Knopf, 1995. Vintage paperback, 1996.
- In the Palaces of Memory: How We Build the Worlds Inside Our Heads. Knopf, 1991. Vintage paperback, 1992.
- Machinery of the Mind: Inside the New Science of Artificial Intelligence. Times Books, 1986. Tempus / Microsoft paperback, 1987.
- Architects of Fear: Conspiracy Theories and Paranoia in American Politics. Tarcher/Houghton Mifflin, 1984.
