= Nonzero: The Logic of Human Destiny =

Book by Robert Wright

- Author: Robert Wright
- Language: English
- Publisher: Pantheon Books
- Publication date: 1999
- Publication place: United States
- Pages: 435
- ISBN: 9780679442523

Nonzero: The Logic of Human Destiny is a 1999 book by Robert Wright, in which the author argues that biological evolution and cultural evolution are shaped and directed first and foremost by "non-zero-sumness" i.e., the prospect of creating new interactions that are not zero-sum.

== Thesis ==
The principal argument of Nonzero is to demonstrate that natural selection results in increasing complexity within the world and greater rewards for cooperation. Since, as Wright puts it, the realization of such prospects is dependent upon increased levels of globalization, communication, cooperation, and trust, what is thought of as human intelligence is really just a long step in an evolutionary process of organisms (as well as their networks and individual parts) getting better at processing information.

Through this lens, and an overview of human history, Wright typifies the argument against the views of noted paleontologist Stephen Jay Gould. Gould wrote that "Humans are here by the luck of the draw." Wright acknowledges one aspect of Gould's argument—that the evolutionary process was not such that it would inevitably create humans as we know them today ("five fingers, five toes, and so on") but that evolution would almost certainly result in the creation of highly intelligent, communicating organisms, who would in turn develop tools and advanced technologies.

Evidence for natural selection driving improvements in information processing is given throughout, including the case of the bombardier beetle, an insect that developed the ability to spray its attackers with harsh chemicals. This, in turn, favored predators via natural selection who had techniques to avoid the spray. As Wright puts it, "complexity breeds complexity." This is the often referred to evolutionary phenomenon of the "arms race," wherein competing organisms stack up their developments in competition with one another.

Via this increasing complexity, according to Nonzero, higher intelligence was thus destined to happen, perhaps even "inevitable".

== Complexity and zero-sum solutions in human society ==
Wright argues that as complexity in human society increases, the ability to reap "non-zero-sum gains" increases. For example, electronic communications enable trade at a global level, and allow various societies to trade in items they could not produce or obtain otherwise, resulting in benefits for everyone: new goods. Similarly, global governments allow global solutions to common problems. Were aliens to attack, or the Arctic glaciers to melt, the world would be able to use its communicative technologies to band societies together and defend itself at large. In fact, this view of the world as an organic entity itself is touched upon in the penultimate chapter of the book, and is similar to that of Gaia theory.

Of course, when societies band together to fight a common enemy, that enemy is not always an Arctic glacier, but rather, other human societies. Wright discusses this as well, arguing that war between nations often resulted in technological and cultural evolution. For example, World War II spurred the development of the Manhattan Project and, in turn, nuclear power and related research—a technology that may ultimately benefit the world at large. Further, societies with advanced governments were more likely to succeed in war, spreading government systems as a technology in and of itself.

== Structure ==
The book is composed in three sections, each one more or less independent, but contributing to the development of his overall thesis.

=== Part I: A brief history of Humankind ===
This section is a sound summary of human cultural development, fairly conventional, except for his references to game theory and the occasional interjection of metaphysical speculation.

=== Part II: A brief history of Organic Life ===
This section is again a broadly conventional overview of current understanding of the development of life on earth. He argues from game-theory that increasing complexity is inevitably going to result from the operation of evolution by natural selection. More controversially, he argues that intelligence, social co-operation and cultural development are also bound to emerge sooner or later.

=== Part III: From Here to Eternity ===
This brief section is the most controversial part of the book, which he admits is speculative and presents with a degree of humility. The main thrust of his argument is that we may be on the threshold of a new phase of development involving the creation of a unified global consciousness, along the lines suggested in the writings of Jesuit Pierre Teilhard de Chardin.

== Corollaries and criticism ==
Even the development of weapons systems themselves (and Wright's discussion of their increasing complexity over time) left him open to criticism, put into words by Steven Pinker, a linguist/cognitive scientist specializing in evolutionary psychology:

"Natural selection has the "goal" of enhancing replication, period. An increase in complexity and cooperation is just one of many subgoals that help organisms attain that ultimate goal. Other subgoals include increases in size, speed, motor coordination, weaponry, energy efficiency, perceptual acuity, parental care, and so on. All have increased over evolutionary time, but none is the "natural end" of the evolutionary process. Would anyone single out lethal weaponry as "highly likely" or our "destiny," just because weapons have become more lethal over organic and human history?" -Steven Pinker, from Nonzero, Slate.com.

Similarly, the idea of greater and greater non-zero-sum gains benefiting the world at large is also debated, as such technologies allow the injury of ever larger numbers of people. While Wright believes that the goal of natural selection is increasing non-zero-sum gains, it is also clear that these gains might not benefit everyone. Though this does not in any way invalidate Wright's thesis, it does dampen the optimism Wright appears to hold for non-zero-sum dynamics. Indeed, in a world of separated, village-like units, atrocities within Joseph Stalin's Soviet Union or Adolf Hitler's Third Reich could not have occurred. (Of course, life within those village-like units had its own inherent problems, and the question of which point in history was better is addressed by arguments within teleology—whether history has a direction, and thus if history has shown consistent progress.) Wright believes that overall there has been net progress (with some exceptions), and further, that this progress will continue. In response to Wright's assumption that cooperation and communication will continue to increase, Pinker writes:

"...global cooperation and moral progress will not increase toward some theoretical maximum or Teilhardesque Omega Point, but will level off at a point where the pleasures resulting from global cooperation (having more stuff than you had before) are balanced by the pleasures resulting from non-cooperation (having more stuff than your neighbors, or the warm glow of ethnic chauvinism)." -Steven Pinker, from Nonzero, Slate.com.

Pinker also challenges Wright's core thesis, echoing the case made by Stephen Jay Gould, that human-like organisms are no more than a coincidence:

"A species with humanlike intelligence was no more "in the cards" than a species with an elephantlike trunk--both are just handy biological gadgets. (Of course, given enough time, humanlike intelligence is near-certain to evolve; but given enough time, anything with nonzero probability is near-certain to evolve, including an elephantlike trunk.) A brain with the intelligence necessary for cooperation and specialization is metabolically expensive and biomechanically hazardous, and evolves only when the evolutionary precursor and current ecosystem make the benefits exceed the costs. Most lineages (e.g., of plants) never got smart, and all lineages of animals on earth except ours were stuck well beneath the subgenius level." -Steven Pinker, from Nonzero, Slate.com.

== Wright's response to criticism ==
Wright acknowledges several of these criticisms within Nonzero itself and in turn responds with his purpose in writing the book—that by acknowledging options to reap non-zero-sum gains, societies might work to decrease zero-sum losses, like the loss of resources used in the pursuit of armed conflict.

In response to Pinker's comments regarding the inevitability of human-like intelligence (as versus to the elephant trunk), Wright replies:

A human level of intelligence--unlike an elephant's trunk--is a key step in [the march of evolution], for it gives rise to a rapid and powerful kind of cultural evolution, an evolution that increasingly, in a sense, takes on a life of its own, and has gotten us from the stone age to now... The modern world, it seems to me, features a second kind of validation of my emphasis on the biological evolution of intelligence, and my insistence that biological and cultural evolution have important parallels. A number of observers have noted that the Internet (defined broadly, to include the people who communicate over it) strikingly resembles a giant global brain. No one has claimed that it resembles a giant elephant's trunk.

— Robert Wright (journalist), Nonzero, Slate.com

There is also the question of whether non-zero-sum gains will—or even should—benefit all members of society under any system of egalitarianism. Wright does argue that increased levels of communication will inevitably lead to a decrease in enmity between some populations. Still, this does not answer the question of whether some members of society will ever "catch-up" in terms of technological connectedness, or if some might be barred entirely by some kind of oppressive (but still productive) political system. Wright states on p. 329 of Nonzero (Vintage Paperback edition) that "one can well imagine, as the Internet nurtures more and more communities of interest, true friendships more and more crossing the most dangerous fault lines—boundaries of religion, of nationality, of ethnicity, of culture." Wright then states in his endnote to the section, "a big question is whether boundaries of social class will be so easily crossed — or whether, on the other hand, differences of social class within a society might sharpen as people invest more of their energy in virtual communities consisting of like-minded people."

Though Wright clearly does not posit an answer to the question of struggles among economic classes—whether they be because of or in spite of natural selection—some argue it is relevant to Wright's treatment of evolution as resulting in greater and greater moral progress, and thus strangely ignored, given that Wright is the author of another book examining human morality The Moral Animal.

== Wright and creationists ==
Wright argues for the possibility of divine purpose (and thus for the concept of God as a creating entity) but is against creationism, and theories on intelligent design. He argued against the concepts in articles related to Nonzero.

Like most biologists, Wright firmly rejects the notion of divine biological manipulation. But Wright does leave open the possibility of divine intervention in the case of human consciousness, which he does not see as being easily explained by natural selection. Consciousness—humans' ability to ponder their own existence—seems a strange outgrowth of the evolutionary process for Wright. He describes the alternative as humans that are devoid of consciousness and behave like zombies that form romantic relationships, eat, sleep, and have discussions only because they are programmed to via cultural and genetic transmission.

Wright argues that consciousness is still a mystery in terms of evolutionary purpose, and leaves open the possibility that a divine entity introduced the phenomenon of consciousness. Wright also debates whether or not entities aside from humans possess consciousness.

Wright also briefly questions the possibilities regarding what created natural selection, but Wright himself refers to his comments as highly speculative.

Wright's idea of divinity is further explored in his follow-up book, The Evolution of God. He does not argue that an intelligent being is behind it all, but that the existence of a process that could be called divine is suggested, much the way the existence of electrons is suggested by the inner workings of a computer (despite no one ever seeing one).

== Bibliographical information ==
Nonzero: The Logic of Human Destiny, January 2001 ISBN 0-679-44252-9, ISBN 0-679-75894-1

The Evolution of God, June 2009 ISBN 978-0-316-73491-2 (Hardcover, 1st edition)
