= The Evolution of God =

2009 book by Robert Wright

- Book cover
- Author: Robert Wright
- Language: English
- Subject: God
- Publisher: Little, Brown and Company
- Publication date: June 8, 2009
- Publication place: United States
- Media type: Print (Hardcover and Paperback
- Pages: 576
- ISBN: 0-316-73491-8
- OCLC: 277086176
- Dewey Decimal: 200.9 22
- LC Class: BL473 .W75 2009
- Preceded by: Nonzero: The Logic of Human Destiny
- Followed by: Why Buddhism is True

The Evolution of God is a 2009 book by Robert Wright, in which the author explores the history of the concept of God in the three Abrahamic religions through a variety of means, including archaeology, history, theology, and evolutionary psychology. The patterns which link Judaism, Christianity, and Islam and the ways in which they have changed their concepts over time are explored as one of the central themes.

One of the conclusions of the book that Wright tries to make is a reconciliation between science and religion. He also speculates on the future of the concept of God.

== Evolutionary biology ==
Among other things, Wright discusses the role of evolutionary biology in the development of religion. Geneticist Dean Hamer hypothesized that some people have a specific gene that makes them prone to religious belief, which he calls the God gene, and that over time natural selection has favored these people because their spirituality leads to optimism. Wright, however, thinks the tendency towards religious belief is not an adaptive trait influenced by natural selection, but rather a spandrel—a trait that happens to be supported by adaptations originally selected for other purposes. Wright states that the human brain approaches religious belief based on how it adapted to survive and reproduce in early hunter-gatherer societies.

He points out four key traits of religion that align with the human brain's survival adaptations:

- Its claims can be surprising, strange, and even counterintuitive.
- It claims to show what causes good and bad things to happen.
- It tells people that they can control these causes and increase the ratio of good to bad results.
- It is hard to falsify or disprove.

Humans have adapted to pay attention to surprising and confusing information because it could make the difference between life and death (for instance, if a person left the campsite and mysteriously never returned, it would be wise for the others to be on guard for a predator or some other danger). Understanding and controlling cause and effect also takes top priority in the human brain, since humans live in complex social groups where predicting and influencing the actions and thoughts of others gains them allies, status, and access to resources. As human cognitive abilities and curiosity expanded over the centuries, their investigation of cause and effect expanded from the strictly social context out into the world at large, opening the doors for religions to explain things like weather and disease.

Though some of these explanations were strange and perhaps dubious, the fact that they could not be completely disproven lent them credibility; it was better to be cautious than dead. Wright uses an example from the Haida people, indigenous to the northwest coast of North America, who would try to appease killer whale deities to calm storms out at sea; they would pour fresh water into the ocean or tie tobacco or deer tallow to the end of a paddle. While some people certainly died despite these offerings, those who survived were a testament to the ritual's possible efficacy.

Mysterious and unproven beliefs can also persist in a culture because human brains have adapted to agree with the group consensus even if it goes against one's better judgment or personal beliefs, since a person alienated from the group loses protection, food, and mates. Wright cites the Asch conformity experiments and even posits that Stockholm syndrome is not so much a syndrome as a natural product of evolution, the brain's way of ensuring that a person accepts and is accepted by their new social group. In addition, beliefs can persist because once a person publicly announces a belief, social psychologists have found that he or she is inclined to focus on evidence supporting that belief while conveniently ignoring evidence contradicting it, a logical fallacy known as cherry picking.

== Reviews ==
Journalist and political commentator Andrew Sullivan gave the book a positive review in The Atlantic, saying that the book "...gave me hope that we can avoid both the barrenness of a world without God and the horrible fusion of fundamentalism and weapons of mass destruction."

Newsweek religion editor, Lisa Miller, described The Evolution of God as a reframing of the faith vs. reason debate. Drawing a contrast to such authors as Sam Harris, Richard Dawkins and Christopher Hitchens, Miller gives an overall positive review of the book's approach to the examination of the concept of God.

In a review for The New York Times, Yale professor of psychology Paul Bloom said, "In his brilliant new book, “The Evolution of God,” Robert Wright tells the story of how God grew up." Bloom sums up Wright's controversial stance as, "Wright’s tone is reasoned and careful, even hesitant, throughout, and it is nice to read about issues like the morality of Christ and the meaning of jihad without getting the feeling that you are being shouted at. His views, though, are provocative and controversial. There is something here to annoy almost everyone."

However, in a New York Times review that included a reply from Wright, Nicholas Wade, a writer for the "Science Times" section, notes the book is "a disappointment from the Darwinian perspective", because evolution "provides a simpler explanation for moral progression than the deity Wright half invokes." Wright replied to Wade's comments, saying Wade had misunderstood Wright's argument and that "The deity (if there is one–and I’m agnostic on that point) would be realizing moral progress through evolution’s creation of the human moral sense (and through the subsequent development of that moral sense via cultural evolution, particularly technological evolution)." Wade replied that "evolution seems to me a sufficient explanation for the moral progress that Mr. Wright correctly discerns in the human condition, so there seemed no compelling need to invoke a deity."

== Promotional appearances ==
To promote the book, Wright did a variety of interviews, including with the New York Times, Publishers Weekly, and Bill Moyers Journal. He also did a series of videos on Bloggingheads.tv, a website he co-founded with Mickey Kaus. Wright also appeared on The Colbert Report on August 18, 2009.

== See also ==
- Darwin's Cathedral: Evolution, Religion, and the Nature of Society by David Sloan Wilson, published in 2002.
- Breaking the Spell: Religion as a Natural Phenomenon by Daniel Dennett, published in 2006.
