= Altered Traits =

2017 book by science journalist Daniel Goleman and neuroscientist Richard Davidson

Altered Traits: Science Reveals How Meditation Changes Your Mind, Brain, and Body
- First edition
- Author: Daniel Goleman and Richard Davidson
- Language: English
- Subject: Research on meditation
- Publisher: Avery Publishing
- Publication date: September 5, 2017
- Publication place: United States
- Media type: Print (hardcover and paperback)
- Pages: 336 (hardcover)
- ISBN: 978-0399184383 (hardcover)

Altered Traits: Science Reveals How Meditation Changes Your Mind, Brain, and Body, published in Great Britain as 'The Science of Meditation: How to Change Your Brain, Mind and Body', is a 2017 book by science journalist Daniel Goleman and neuroscientist Richard Davidson. The book discusses research on meditation. For the book, the authors conducted a literature review of over 6,000 scientific studies on meditation, and selected the 60 that they believed met the highest methodological standards.

== Summary ==
The authors write that meditation can be practised at two levels: the "deep path" of intensive meditative discipline aiming for total self-transformation, and the "wide path" of less intensive practice that can reach a larger number of people. The book discusses both these levels, with findings on the highest-level meditators toward the end of the book. After attending meditation retreats in Asia and while graduate students together at Harvard in the 1970s, Goleman and Davidson formulated the hypothesis that "the after is the before for the next during"—meaning the changes that endure after the end of a meditation session contribute to a more equanimous starting point for the next meditation session. Such lasting psychological changes, or altered traits, are the focus of the book, as opposed to altered states of consciousness during meditation that end along with the meditation session. The authors explain a range of methodological obstacles to studying meditation scientifically, which have resulted in many flawed studies; they write that based on an exhaustive literature review by Davidson's research group, they selected only studies they deemed to meet the highest standards to use in the book.

The authors write that meditation leads to reduced stress reactivity, for instance that 30 hours of mindfulness-based stress reduction (MBSR) practice leads to reduced amygdala activation and that long-term meditation practice increases connectivity between the prefrontal cortex (PFC) and the amygdala. Regarding compassion, they distinguish between cognitive empathy, emotional empathy, and empathic concern, the last of which results in action to help reduce suffering, and state that as little as eight hours of loving-kindness meditation can increase empathic concern. They write that meditation is at its core about retraining attention, and discuss studies showing that a small amount of meditation can improve attention in the short-term (as reflected, for instance, in a shorter attentional blink) while long-term practice brings lasting improvement. Next, the authors turn to the sense of self, reflected in the self-referential and often unpleasant mind-wandering of the brain's default mode network, writing that in early meditation practice brain circuits encourage its activity and that in later practice activity in the network itself decreases. While they state that meditation was not originally developed to treat illness, it does appear to have some beneficial effects in this regard, including reducing levels of pro-inflammatory cytokines—though they say these are not yet well understood. Meditation was likewise not designed to treat psychopathology, but they note (among other findings) that a meta-analysis of 47 studies found meditation and medicine equally effective in treating depression, anxiety, and pain, without medication's negative side effects.

The next chapter recounts how Davidson's lab, with the help of French Buddhist monk Matthieu Ricard, recruited yogis including Mingyur Rinpoche in order to study the neurological effects of high-level meditation, and—in a much-cited study—found substantial surges in both electrical activity (using EEG) and activity in the brain's circuits for empathy (using fMRI) when Mingyur meditated on compassion. The authors write that experienced yogis have much higher levels of gamma waves, that they show little anticipation of pain and a very fast recovery from it, and that they can re-focus and hold their attention with little effort. The authors then summarize the benefits of meditation they have so far described for three levels of practice: beginner, long-term, and "Olympic-level." In the last chapter, the authors discuss possible new applications of meditation research, and remind their readers of the paucity of reliable data on meditation when they first became interested in the 1970s compared to the large and growing evidence base available now.

== Reception ==
A book review for Psych Central praises the book for avoiding the common sensationalism on the topic while exploring important research. It states: "In their new book, [...] recognized experts in their fields and lifelong meditators Daniel Goleman and Richard J. Davidson reveal the data that demonstrate just what meditation can and can’t do."

UC Berkeley's Greater Good Magazine gave a strongly positive review of the book. It describes Altered Traits as "a highly readable book that helps readers separate the wheat from the chaff of mindfulness science" and which makes "a cogent argument that meditation, in various forms, has the power to transform us not only in the moment, but in more profound, lasting ways." The review also states that "Davidson and Goleman dutifully report the counter evidence as well."

The book received a more critical review in the journal NeuroRegulation. The review gives a list of noteworthy research findings and methodological contributions for future research, and acknowledges the obstacles faced by scientists working in fields that are not fully accepted. However, in a concluding note it cautions: "From an academic point of view, even this book and the research shared adds up to a set of questionable empirical evidence that at times clearly lacks impartiality."

A review in New Scientist compares the book with Thomas Joiner's book Mindlessness, which argues that mindfulness meditation has been oversold. The review calls Altered Traits "much needed" while dismissing Joiner's criticism of mindfulness as misplaced.

An article on Mindful.org comments that "when you weed out the studies that don’t meet the highest scientific standards, as Goleman and Davidson have done in their book, a clear picture emerges of what we know about the science of meditation—and what we still need to learn."

== See also ==
- Mind and Life Institute
- Francisco Varela
- Mindfulness
- Brain activity and meditation
- Neuroplasticity
- Mindfulness-based cognitive therapy (MBCT)
- Buddhism and psychology
- Waking Up: A Guide to Spirituality Without Religion by Sam Harris
- Why Buddhism is True by Robert Wright
