= Horgan surface =

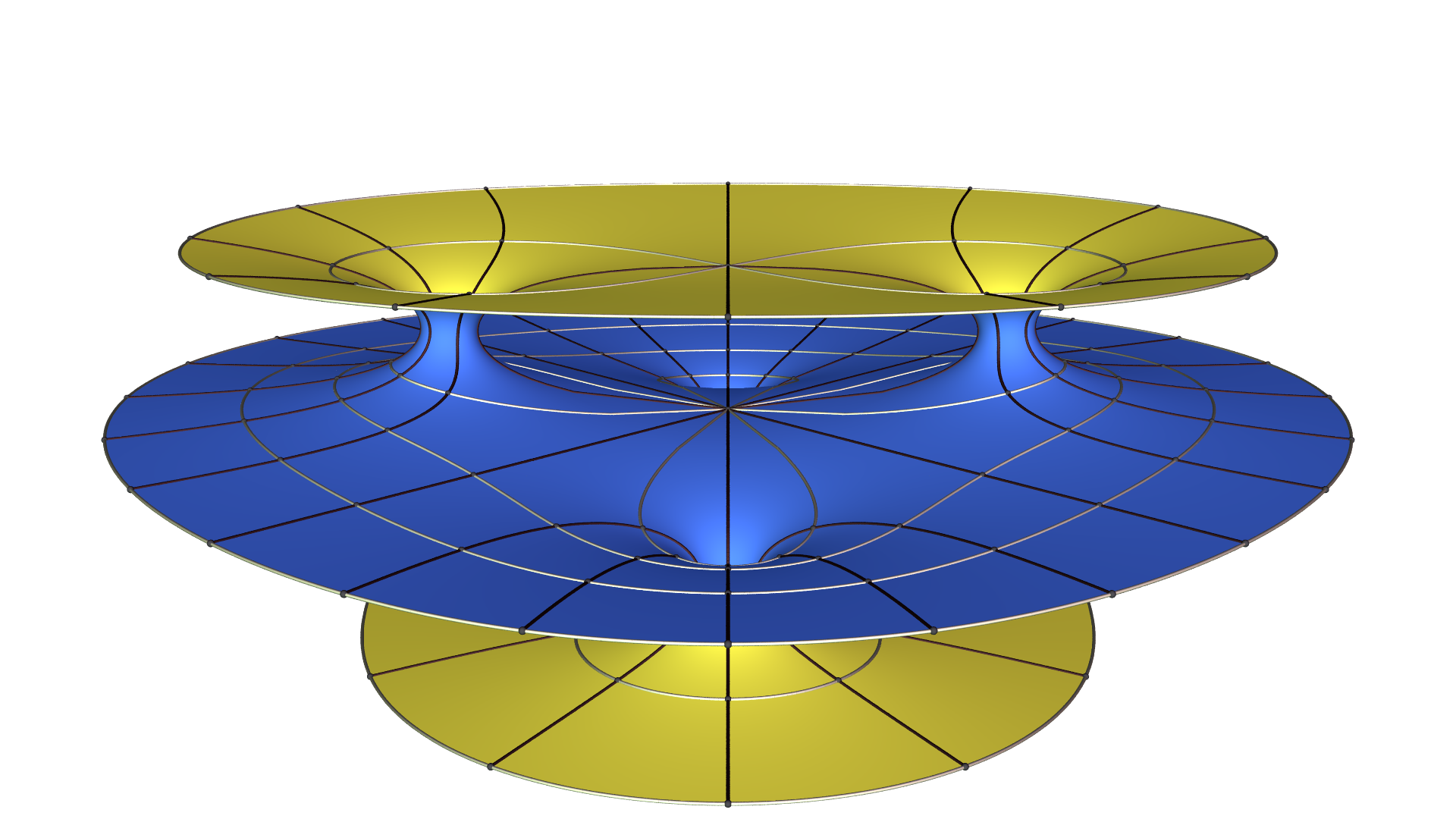
The Horgan minimal non-surface

In differential geometry, Horgan's surface is a near-minimal surface.

David Hoffman and Hermann Karcher explored complete, embedded, and finite total curvature minimal surfaces. They considered a genus 2 variation of the Costa surface, with the same symmetries, one planar end, and two catenoid ends. While computer modeling of the surface looked promising, the period problem cannot be solved, and there does not exist any minimal surface with this symmetry.

Hoffman and Karcher named the simulated surface after John Horgan, as a response to his claim that the use of rigorous mathematical proofs was becoming obsolete: they saw it as a case for the necessity of rigorous proof. Horgan appear to have taken the naming well.
