= Tom Troscianko =

British-Polish psychologist & optometrist (1953–2011)

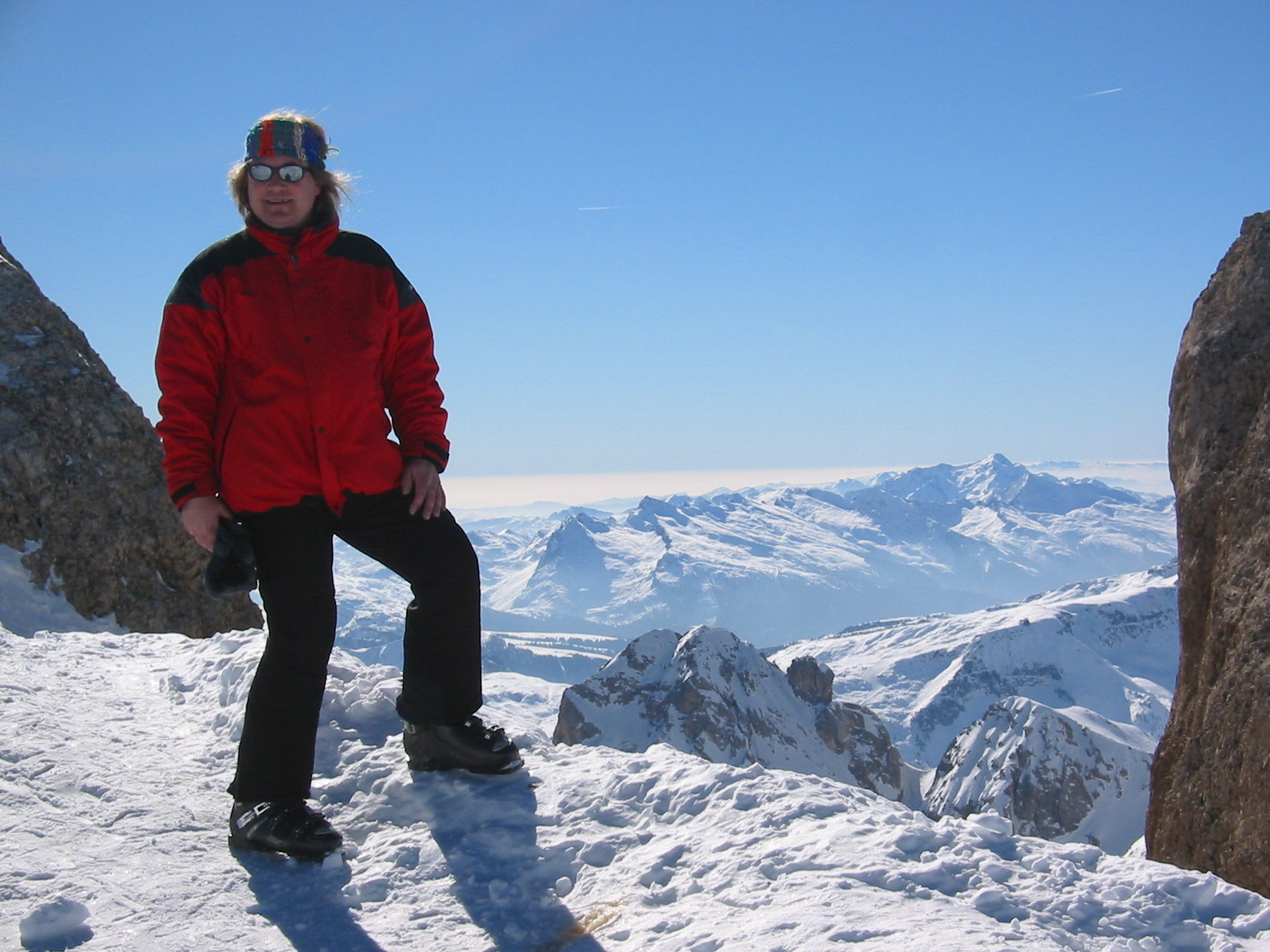
- Troscianko in 2003
- Born: Tomasz Stanisław Trościanko; 30 January 1953; Munich, West Germany
- Died: 16 November 2011 (aged 58); Amsterdam, North Holland, Netherlands
- Education: University of Manchester; City University, London
- Spouse: Susan Blackmore (m. 1977; div. 2009)
- Partner: Carol Laidler
- Children: 2
- Scientific career
- Fields: Psychology; optometry
- Workplaces: University of Bristol; University of Sussex; IBM Hursley
- Thesis: Factors affecting colour saturation (1978)
- Doctoral advisor: Charles Pagham

Tomasz Stanisław Trościanko (30 January 1953 – 16 November 2011) was a British-Polish psychologist and optometrist

== Early life and education ==
Tomasz Stanisław Trościanko was born stateless on 30 January 1953 in Munich, West Germany (present-day, Germany) to Polish parents, Anna Trościanko and Wiktor Trościanko. In 1962, Troscianko travelled alone to England in order to attend the Fawley Court Polish school in Henley-on-Thames.

Upon leaving school in 1970, Troscianko initially worked as a lab technician at British Steel, before studying physics at the University of Manchester. Following graduation Troscianko worked at Kodak, which led to an interest in colour vision. Troscianko studied for a PhD in optometry and visual science at City University. Supervised by Charles Pagham, Troscianko was awarded a PhD for thesis entitled Factors affecting colour saturation in 1978.

== Career ==
In 1979 he started a postdoctoral research position at the University of Bristol, where he worked for many years with Richard Gregory. For the year 1985–1986 Tom, his wife and young family, moved to Germany where Tom held a Research Fellowship from the Alexander von Humboldt Foundation to work at the University of Tübingen Eye Hospital focusing on isoluminance (stimuli with the same luminance but differences in other visual properties) and its effects on the perception of form and motion.

He became a lecturer at the University of Bristol in 1991 and spent most of the rest of his career there. He taught and coordinated undergraduate and postgraduate courses on perception, psychobiology, the ecology of vision, current vision, and the psychology of climate change, and supervised or co-supervised 17 PhD candidates. He also worked at the IBM UK Scientific Centre in Winchester and in 2000 briefly held a chair at the University of Essex. Between 2000 and 2002 he was Professor of Psychology at the University of Sussex. Returning to Bristol in 2002, he became Professor of Psychology in the Department of Experimental Psychology and founded the Cognition and Information Technology Research Centre (COGNIT), promoting an interdisciplinary approach to cognitive neuroscience. He was Principal Investigator on research grants from funders including the MRC, the BBSRC, and the EPSRC, and was a member of EPSRC Peer Review College. In 2007 he founded the Bristol Vision Institute. With Robert Snowden and Peter Thompson, he coauthored the textbook Basic Vision: An Introduction to Visual Perception; the first edition came out in 2006 and the second in 2012, soon after his death.

== Research ==
Tom's research interests were many and varied, ranging from colour vision in apes and birds to artificial vision systems for CCTV cameras to visual search in complex scenes, including for camouflage detection. He was particularly interested in the spatial and spectral properties of natural scenes in relation to the properties of biological systems, and in studying these interactions in species other than humans, in natural environments from the African rain-forest to Bristol's Leigh Woods. With Susan Blackmore, he contributed to the discovery of change blindness and worked on why misjudgments of probability lead people to believe in the paranormal. He was also involved in attempts to create a conscious robot with Iain Gilchrist and Owen Holland (funded by the EPSRC Adventure Fund). Other collaborators, from many different fields, included C. Alejandro Párraga and David Tolhurst on computational modelling, Katerina Mania on virtual reality, and Innes Cuthill and Julian Partridge on bird vision. In the last year or so before he died, Tom had also become very interested in the area of empirical aesthetics, specifically with reference to the feeling of 'presence' as affected by factors like screen size when watching movies.

He was chief editor of the journal Perception for nearly 20 years, and the driving force behind the launch of its open-access sister journal i-Perception. He was associate editor of ACM Transactions on Applied Perception from 2004 until his death, and was long involved in the Applied Vision Association, becoming its secretary in 2003. A frequent and popular speaker at the European Conference on Visual Perception (ECVP), he and Susan Blackmore organised its 11th meeting in Bristol in 1988. He was renowned for never taking the easy route to conferences but turning each trip into an adventure that might involve cars, trains, skis, his camper van, motorbike, and especially boats. A legacy he left to the Applied Vision Association was used to honour his contributions to vision science and particularly his extraordinary travels, by creating The Tom Trościanko Award to support a student to travel to ECVP in a way that Tom would have enjoyed.

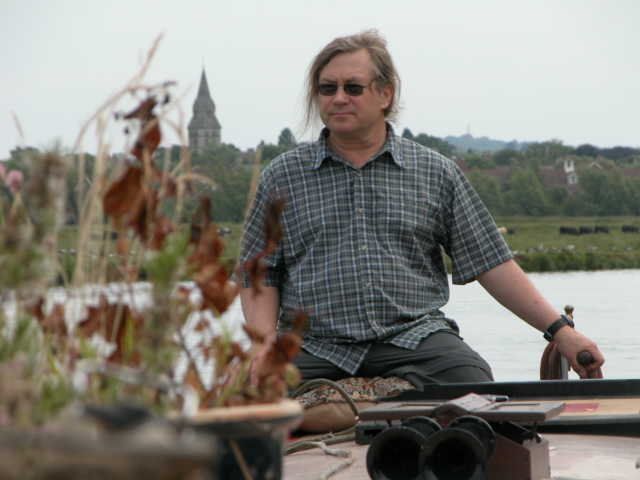

== Death ==
Tom Trościanko died of heart failure on 16 November 2011 in Amsterdam, on his way to give lectures in Germany.

TomFest, a celebration of his life and work, was held on 30 March 2012, involving a boat trip around Bristol harbour, and a series of short talks by colleagues, students, friends, and family, followed by dinner, wine-tasting, and music at the University of Bristol's Wills Memorial Building.

On 2 September, a symposium on ‘Space, colour, natural vision, and conscious robots’ was held at ECVP 2012 in Alghero, Sardinia. The special exhibition, IllusoriaMente (meaning both illusorily and the illusory mind), was dedicated to the memory of the late Professor Richard Gregory and the late Professor Tom Trościanko.
