= Douglas Harding =

British philosopher (1909–2007)

Douglas Edison Harding (12 February 1909 – 11 January 2007) was an English philosophical writer, mystic, spiritual teacher. He authored several books, including On Having No Head: Zen and the Rediscovery of the Obvious (1961), which presents practical methods aimed at helping readers directly experience non-duality and the concept of anattā (selflessness), rather than merely understanding them intellectually.

== Life and career ==
Harding was born in Lowestoft in the county of Suffolk and raised in the Exclusive Brethren, a Christian sect. At age 21, he presented a ten-page document outlining his objections to the church’s teachings to its elders, after which he was formally excommunicated. After graduating from University College, University of London—supported by a scholarship he earned by placing first in the Royal Institute of British Architects’ intermediate exams—he worked as an architect in London and later in India. During World War II, while in India, Harding was commissioned as a Major in the British Army and served with the Royal Engineers.

=== Early work: The Hierarchy of Heaven and Earth ===
In the early 1940s, while working as an architect and engaging in personal philosophical inquiry, Douglas Harding began developing the ideas that would shape his first major work. Drawing on ten years of introspection and study, he sought to understand the nature of personal identity and perception.

In 1943, aged 34, after ten years of self-enquiry, study and writing, Harding had decided he was made of 'layers'. What he was depended on the range of the observer. As a result of his studies, Harding was convinced that he was human only at a certain range. Closer to, he saw himself as cellular, molecular, atomic. At very close range, therefore, he saw himself as almost nothing. It made sense to him therefore that at centre he was a mysterious 'nothingness'. In 1943, he looked back at himself and noticed that from his own point of view he was headless. He was looking not out of two eyes but a 'single eye', a boundless openness – an openness that was self-evidently aware, and was also full of the whole world. Here was direct experience of his central identity, his True Self. No longer did he have to rely on speculation. Following this he spent the next 8 years exploring the scientific, philosophical, psychological, and religious implications of his discovery, presented in his book The Hierarchy of Heaven and Earth, described by C. S. Lewis (who wrote the preface) as "a work of the highest genius". This book was published by Faber & Faber in 1952. After a period away from his professional work, Harding returned to practicing architecture.

=== "Headlessness" ===
Harding continued to write, but it was not until 1961 that he clearly shared the experience of "headlessness" in his most famous book, On Having No Head: Zen and the Rediscovery of the Obvious. He encouraged readers to reproduce his realization in order to experience non-duality (anattā), i.e. that there is no separate self inhabiting your consciousness and “experiencing your experience”. He found that his headless insight was illustrated in a very clear way by a "self portrait" he found in Ernst Mach's book From The Analysis of Sensations (1891). The drawing, titled "View from the Left Eye"", was described by Mach: "I lie upon my sofa. If I close my right eye, the picture represented in the accompanying cut is presented to my left eye. In a frame formed by the ridge of my eyebrow, by my nose, and by my moustache, appears a part of my body, so far as visible, with its environment.".

"View from the Left Eye" drawing by Ernst Mach

The drawing inspired Douglas Harding to notice his own “headlessness” in 1942.

Following this breakthrough, Harding gradually began sharing his approach to perception and self-awareness with a wider audience. In the late 1960s and early 1970s, he developed a series of practical exercises he called "experiments". He described these as a significant development in making the direct experience of one’s true nature—what he referred to as being both “No-thing and Everything”—accessible to others. Harding was emphatic that people tested out his claims for themselves - "you are the sole and final authority on you". He rejected the role of 'guru', always pointing others back to themselves. "Look for yourself". Harding said of this meditation, "While it lasts, this is an all-or-nothing (actually, an All-and- Nothing) meditation which can't be done badly."

What actually happened was something absurdly simple and unspectacular: I stopped thinking. A peculiar quiet, an odd kind of alert limpness or numbness, came over me. Reason and imagination and all mental chatter died down. For once, words really failed me. Past and future dropped away. I forgot who and what I was, my name, manhood, animalhood, all that could be called mine. It was as if I had been born that instant, brand new, mindless, innocent of all memories. There existed only the Now, that present moment and what was clearly given in it. To look was enough. And what I found was khaki trouserlegs terminating downwards in a pair of brown shoes, khaki sleeves terminating sideways in a pair of pink hands, and a khaki shirtfront terminating upwards in—absolutely nothing whatever! Certainly not in a head.

— Douglas Edison Harding, "Harding’s Moment of Discovery", On Having No Head (1961)

Sam Harris, in his book Waking Up: A Guide to Spirituality Without Religion, interprets Harding's assertion that he has no head by stating that Harding's words "must be read in the first-person sense; the man was not claiming to have been literally decapitated. From a first-person point of view, his emphasis on headlessness is a stroke of genius that offers an unusually clear description of what it's like to glimpse the nonduality of consciousness".

Harding taught several techniques to help readers attain this experience. The first one is a pointing exercise: "Point to your feet, legs, belly, chest, then to what's above that. Go on looking at what your finger's now pointing to. Looking at what?"

=== Other work ===
In addition to writing numerous books and articles and developing his “Headlessness” experiments, Harding also created the Youniverse Explorer—a model illustrating the layered structure of the body and mind, from the scale of galaxies down to particles. At the center of these layers is a clear sphere, representing one’s True Nature, or “No-face".

Harding travelled widely, sharing the concepts of “Seeing” and “Headlessness”, as described in his most popular book, On Having No Head: Zen and the Rediscovery of the Obvious. In 1996, he and Richard Lang founded the Sholland Trust, a charity created to help share Harding's teachings, known as “The Headless Way”. During the 1990s and early 2000s, Harding conducted workshops alongside his second wife, Catherine.

He was married twice and had two sons and a daughter. He died in Nacton, near Ipswich, England.

== Books ==
- The Hierarchy of Heaven and Earth ISBN 978-0-9568877-1-9
- Look for Yourself: The Science and Art of Self-Realization ISBN 978-1-908774-11-8
- On Having No Head: Zen and the Rediscovery of the Obvious ISBN 978-1-908774-06-4
- Head Off Stress ISBN 978-0-9554512-0-1
- Religions of the World ISBN 978-0-435-46531-5
- To Be and Not To Be, That is the Answer: Unique Experiments for Tapping Our Infinite Resources ISBN 978-1-908774-17-0
- The Trial of the Man who Said he was God ISBN 978-0-14-019363-3
- The Little Book of Life and Death ISBN 978-0-9554512-1-8
- Open to the Source: Selected Teachings of Douglas E. Harding ISBN 978-1-908774-50-7
- Face to No-Face: Rediscovering Our Original Nature ISBN 978-1-878019-15-8
- As I See It: Articles, selected by Richard Lang ISBN 978-1-908774-51-4
- The Face Game: Liberation without Dogmas, Drugs or Delay ISBN 978-1-908774-48-4
- Visible Gods: A Modern Socratic Dialogue ISBN 978-1-908774-01-9
- The Science of the 1st Person: Its Principles, Practice and Potential ISBN 978-0-9554512-3-2
- Journey To The Centre Of The Youniverse ISBN 978-1-908774-46-0

== Films ==
- On Having No Head: Seeing One's Original Nature
