= The Human Zoo (radio) =

UK radio programme presented by Tommy Boyd

The Human Zoo was a British radio programme presented by Tommy Boyd, with his engineer Asher Gould acting as co-presenter. It was broadcast on Talksport from May 2000 until Boyd's dismissal in April 2002. The programme was named after the 1969 book by Desmond Morris.

== Format ==
The programme used a phone-in format in which callers were not pre-screened and were put straight to air. To comply with broadcasting regulations, the station's output was broadcast on a short delay, and a dump button allowed the studio team to cut offensive remarks from callers before they aired. The unscreened format influenced later live phone-in programmes, including Triple M, launched by LBC presenter Iain Lee in 2006.

== Demise ==
On the Sunday night following the death of the Queen Mother in March 2002, a caller who claimed to be a republican said on air that he would like to shoot the British royal family. Boyd and his production team failed to use the profanity delay to "dump" the remarks, and a listener complained to the Radio Authority. Boyd and his production team were dismissed from Talksport in April 2002.
