= Bloggingheads.tv =

Video blog website, 2005–2022

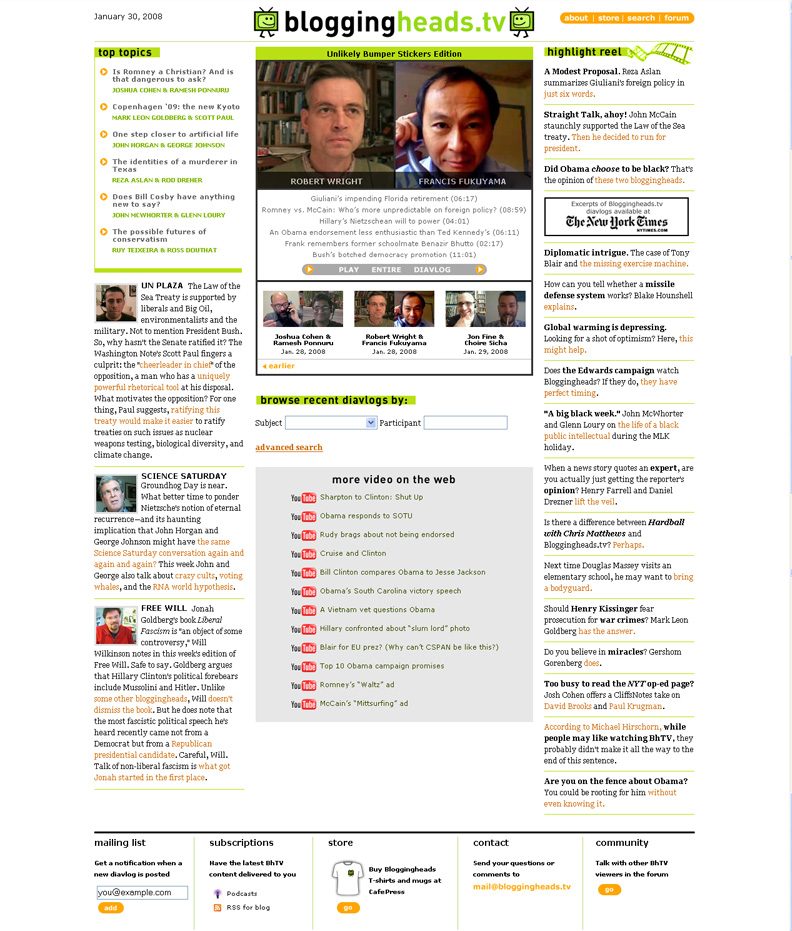
- Screenshot Screenshot of Bloggingheads.tv
- Website type: Video discussion (political · scientific · current events)
- Dissolved: 2022
- Owner: Robert Wright
- Founders: Robert Wright; Mickey Kaus
- Key people: Robert Wright; Mickey Kaus; John Horgan; George Johnson; David Corn; James Pinkerton; Glenn Loury; Will Wilkinson
- Products: Video sharing; video blog; podcast
- Employees: Fewer than 10
- Website: bloggingheads.tv
- Registration: Optional (required to comment)
- Launched: November 1, 2005; 20 years ago
- Current status: Operational

Bloggingheads.tv, sometimes abbreviated "bhtv", is a political, world events, philosophy, and science video blog discussion site which the participants took part in a back-and-forth conversations via webcam, which were then broadcast online to viewers. The site operated as a project of the Nonzero Foundation since 2012, but the site was started by the journalist and author Robert Wright and blogger and journalist Mickey Kaus on November 1, 2005. Kaus later stepped back from operational duties, saying he did not want his frequent linking to the site to be seen as a conflict of interest.

Most of the earlier discussions involved one or both of the founders, but the site eventually grew to include more than one thousand individual contributors, mostly journalists, academics, scientists, authors, well known political bloggers, and other notable individuals. Unregistered users were able to view all of the videos on the site, while free registration was required to comment on discussions or participate in the forums. On April 2022, Wright announced that Bloggingheads would be ending, stating that "the era in which Bloggingheads makes sense is kinda over," however the site currently continues to operate.

== Format ==
Bloggingheads discussions were conducted via webcam between two or more people, and can be viewed online in Flash format, or downloaded as WMV, MP4, or MP3 files. New diavlogs are generally posted daily, and are all archived for future viewing. The diavlogs are generally broken up into a series of topics and subtopics a few minutes in length, links to which are placed below the video window to allow viewers to navigate to a given topic if they do not wish to view the whole discussion.

Most of the discussions posted to Bloggingheads.tv involve well known (or semi-well known) journalists, bloggers, science writers, scientists, philosophers, book authors, or other specialists in segments of current world events. Many of the discussions are of a political nature or are related to the current political environment. Those with differing points of view are often matched against one another. Diavlogs involving guests appearing for the first time often take the form of an interview, more often than that of a discussion, with a longtime Bloggingheads contributor playing the role of interviewer.

=== Regular segments ===
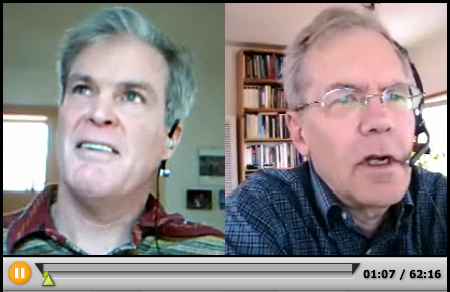
John Horgan and George Johnson on a "Science Saturday" episode of Bloggingheads.tv

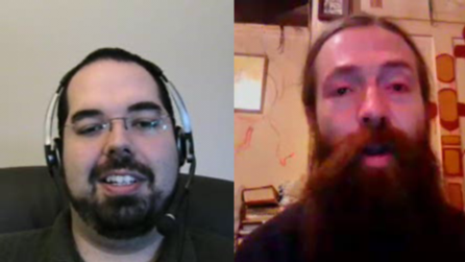
Aubrey de Grey being interviewed by Eliezer Yudkowsky on Bloggingheads.tv

Although most episodes and matchups do not occur on any kind of a regular basis, there are a few notable exceptions to this. There is a frequent diavlog matchup between the two co-founders of Bloggingheads.tv, Robert Wright and Mickey Kaus, generally related to politics in some form, that usually occurs on either Wednesday or Thursday. While some of the other diavloggers are frequently matched against each other (e.g. David Corn & James Pinkerton) there is usually not a regularly scheduled time at which they take place.

"Science Saturday" was the name given to the weekly episode appearing on Saturday that was always science related. Its last episode was released on December 24, 2011. It usually (but not always) involved either one or both of the science writers John Horgan and George Johnson. Many well-known people in the science community were a part of Science Saturday, including Michael Shermer of Skeptic Magazine, biologist PZ Myers, geneticist Craig Venter, aging researcher and biogerontologist Aubrey de Grey, and philosopher David Chalmers, among many others. However, in September 2009, four high-profile science bloggers who had previously participated in Bloggingheads.tv discussions publicly distanced themselves from the site and stated they would no longer agree to appear in Bloggingheads.tv segments. The scientists – Sean Carroll, Carl Zimmer, Phil Plait and PZ Myers – criticized what they described as a policy of providing a platform for creationism without an opposing point of view. PZ Myers said: "[Bloggingheads.tv] was setting up crackpots with softball interviews that made them look reasonable, because their peculiar ideas were never confronted."

"The Week in Blog" was a weekly segment which normally appeared on the site on Fridays. Its last episode was released on March 7, 2012. The format was to discuss what had appeared on blogs over the past week, from both a liberal and conservative viewpoint. The three regular hosts of "TWIB" were Bill Scher of Liberal Oasis, Kristin Soltis of the Winston Group, and Matt Lewis of The Daily Caller. Original host Conn Carroll of The Heritage Foundation stepped aside in early 2009. Guests who appeared on the show included Armando Llorens (of Daily Kos), Amanda Carpenter, and Nate Silver (of FiveThirtyEight) among many others.

== History ==
On November 1, 2005, the site launched, with Robert Wright and Mickey Kaus as the only two initial participants in the video discussions. The site has since featured more than one thousand other diavloggers. On October 18, 2006, a site redesign was launched, with a revised home page and improved functionality: ability to comment on diavlogs was added, and to participate in forum discussions.

In January 2007, it was announced that cable TV pioneer and C-SPAN founding chairman Bob Rosencrans, with a loose network of others, would become an angel investor of Bloggingheads.tv. The infusion of cash kicked off a dramatic expansion of the site's content, and a corresponding growth in viewers. On March 24, 2007, a diavlog between Garance Franke-Ruta and Ann Althouse attracted attention after Althouse reacted angrily to a comment by Franke-Ruta referencing an earlier controversy involving Jessica Valenti and former US president Bill Clinton. The exchange was widely discussed on political blogs and in news commentary in the following days.

On October 24, 2007, Bloggingheads.tv entered into a relationship with The New York Times, whereby selected video segments from the Bloggingheads site would appear in the "Videos" section on the Times website, under the Opinion subsection. In 2008, several new segments and diavloggers were added or made more regular, including "Free Will", "The Week in Blog", and "UN Plaza". Other updates and tweaks to the site, such as the addition of the MP4 video format were also gradually phased in. On April 27, 2022, during an appearance on "the DMZ," Wright announced that Bloggingheads will be ending, with the remaining segments moving to their own independent platforms.

=== Media recognition ===
Traditional media outlets, such as The New York Times and others, have written mostly favorable reviews of Bloggingheads.tv. Stories were also often written about individuals who took part in the video discussions, as they were often well-known individuals in the scientific, academic, journalism, or blogosphere community. Some events and personality appearances on Bloggingheads.tv have led to larger than usual amounts of media coverage, such as the March 24, 2007 Ann Althouse controversy described above, and the appearance of Andrew Sullivan on December 26, 2006, and January 1, 2007, when he discussed his reversal of viewpoint on the Iraq War.

== Contributors to Bloggingheads.tv ==
Apart from the regular contributors, a host of well known occasional guests have appeared, usually in the form of being interviewed. Among others, the political scientist Francis Fukuyama talked about his book America at the Crossroads; the Israeli journalist Gershom Gorenberg discussed his book The Accidental Empire (about the history of the settlements); The Washington Post columnist Joel Achenbach on an article of his about global warming deniers (among other topics); Andrew Sullivan on his book The Conservative Soul; biogerentologist Aubrey de Grey on how to defeat the "disease" of aging; philosopher David Chalmers; Nate Silver (of FiveThirtyEight.com); and geneticist Craig Venter, who spoke of future scientific innovations he was pursuing.

== See also ==
- Digital television
- Interactive television
- Podcast
- Political podcast
- MSN TV
- Streaming television
- Video on demand
- Webcast
