= John Horgan (journalist) =

American science journalist

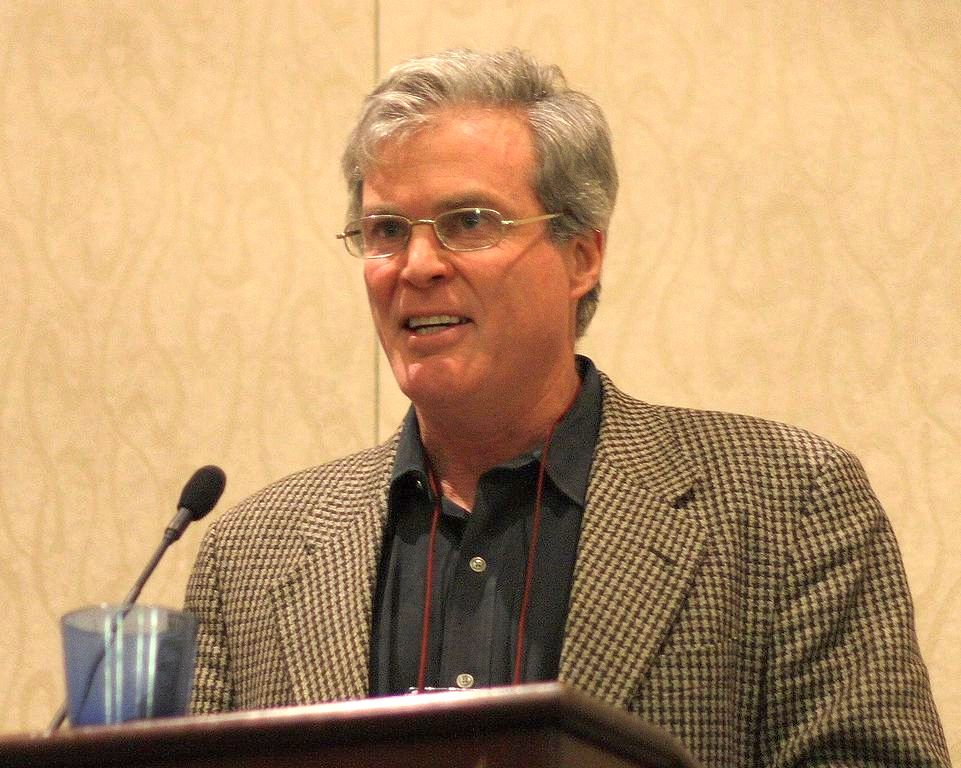
- Horgan speaking at the History of Science Society meeting in 2007
- Born: 1953 (age 72–73)
- Education: Columbia University
- Occupations: Science writer, author
- Notable credit(s): author of The End of Science; has written for many publications, including National Geographic, The New York Times, Time and Newsweek; frequent guest on BloggingHeads.tv; blogger for "Scientific American".

John Horgan (born 1953) is an American science journalist best known for his 1996 book The End of Science. He has written for many publications, including National Geographic, Scientific American, The New York Times, Time, Newsweek, and IEEE Spectrum. His awards include two Science Journalism Awards from the American Association for the Advancement of Science and the National Association of Science Writers Science-in-Society Award. His articles have been included in the 2005, 2006 and 2007 editions of The Best American Science and Nature Writing.

Horgan graduated from the Columbia University School of Journalism in 1983. Between 1986 and 1997 he was a full-time staff writer at Scientific American before turning into freelance. From 2010 to 2020, he wrote the blog Cross-Check for Scientific American. Since 2023, he has written his own blog, also named Cross-Check.

== 1990s assertions ==
His October 1993 Scientific American article, "The Death of Proof", claimed that the growing complexity of mathematics, combined with "computer proofs" and other developments, were undermining traditional concepts of mathematical proof. The article generated "torrents of howls and complaints" from mathematicians, according to David Hoffman (one of the mathematicians Horgan interviewed for the article). In response to this article, the Horgan surface is, sarcastically, named after him. It is a speculated embedded minimal surface whose existence is strongly suggested by computers but doubted by many mathematicians. The non-existence of the Horgan surface is later established rigorously through a mathematical proof, completing the sarcasm with the term "Horgan non-surface".

Horgan's 1996 book The End of Science begins where "The Death of Proof" leaves off: in it, Horgan argues that pure science, defined as "the primordial human quest to understand the universe and our place in it," may be coming to an end. Horgan claims that science will not achieve insights into nature as profound as evolution by natural selection, the double helix, the Big Bang, relativity theory or quantum mechanics. In the future, he suggests, scientists will refine, extend and apply this pre-existing knowledge but will not achieve any more great "revolutions or revelations."

Nobel laureate Phil Anderson wrote in 1999 "The reason that Horgan's pessimism is so wrong lies in the nature of science itself. Whenever a question receives an answer, science moves on and asks a new kind of question, of which there seem to be an endless supply." A front-page review in The New York Times called the book "intellectually bracing, sweepingly reported, often brilliant and sometimes bullying."

In 2000 Horgan wrote a supportive review of Patrick Tierney's Darkness in El Dorado in The New York Times. This review recounted, uncritically, the many accusations leveled against anthropologist Napoleon Chagnon during his field work in Amazonas with the Yanomamö. The resulting controversy ultimately caused Chagnon to retire early from his academic post. However, the book was later found to be fraudulent, and an inquiry by the American Anthropological Association cleared Chagnon of Tierney's accusations.

== Later work ==
In 1999 Horgan followed up The End of Science with The Undiscovered Mind: How the Human Brain Defies Replication, Medication and Explanation, which critiques neuroscience, psychoanalysis, psychopharmacology, evolutionary psychology, behavioral genetics, artificial intelligence and other mind-related fields. For his 2003 book Rational Mysticism, he profiled a number of scientists, mystics, and religious thinkers who have delved into the interface of science, religion and mysticism. He presents his personal impressions of these individuals and a sometimes controversial analysis of their contributions to rational mysticism and the relationship between religion and science. His 2012 book The End of War presents scientific arguments against the widespread belief that war is inevitable.

In 2005, Horgan became the Director of the Center for Science Writings (CSW) at Stevens Institute of Technology, in Hoboken, NJ, where he also teaches science journalism, history of science and other courses. The CSW sponsors lectures by leading science communicators, including geographer Jared Diamond of UCLA, financier/philosopher Nassim Taleb, psychologist Steven Pinker of Harvard, neurologist Oliver Sacks, philosopher Peter Singer of Princeton, economist Jeffrey Sachs of Columbia, and biologist Edward O. Wilson of Harvard.

In 2023, Horgan launched the blog Cross-Check, named after the blog series he wrote for Scientific American from 2010 to 2020.

== Media appearances ==
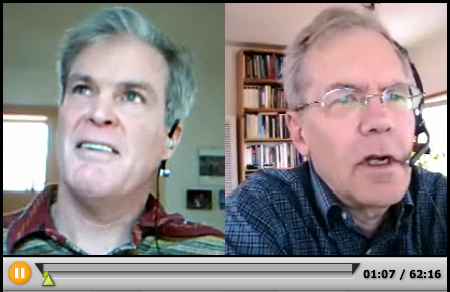
Horgan and George Johnson on a "Science Faction" episode of Bloggingheads.tv

Horgan has appeared on the Charlie Rose show, the Lehrer News Hour and many other media outlets in the U.S. and Europe. Currently he is a frequent host (usually with science writer George Johnson) of "Science Faction", a monthly discussion related to science topics on the website Bloggingheads.tv.

== Political views ==
Horgan has stated that "part of me wonders whether research on race and intelligence—given the persistence of racism in the U.S. and elsewhere—should simply be banned." He has described James Damore and others as "bullies" who "deserve to be fired".

== Bibliography ==
=== Books ===
- (1996) The End of Science: Facing the Limits of Knowledge in the Twilight of the Scientific Age. New York: Broadway Books.
- (1999) The Undiscovered Mind: How the Human Brain Defies Replication, Medication and Explanation. New York: Touchstone.
- (2002) Where Was God on September 11? A Scientist Asks a Ground Zero Pastor. With Reverend Frank Greer. San Francisco: Browntrout Publishers.
- (2003) Rational Mysticism: Dispatches from the Border Between Science and Spirituality. New York: Houghton Mifflin.
- (2012) The End of War. San Francisco: McSweeney's.
- (2018) Mind-Body Problems: Science, Subjectivity & Who We Really Are (Free online book)
- (2020) Pay Attention: Sex, Death, and Science. Terra Nova Press.
- (2023) My Quantum Experiment (Free online book)

=== Articles ===
- Horgan J. (October 1990) Universal Truths (Trends in Cosmology). Scientific American, Vol. 263, No. 4, pp. 108–117. pdf
- Horgan J. (February 1991) In the Beginning... (Trends in Evolution). Scientific American, Vol. 264, No. 2, pp. 116–125. pdf
- Horgan J. (May 1991) Reluctant Revolutionary (Profile: Thomas S. Kuhn unleashed "paradigm" on the world). Scientific American, Vol. 264, No. 5, pp. 40, 49. https://www.jstor.org/stable/24936900
- Horgan J. (June 1991) Questioning the "It from Bit" (Profile: Physicist John A. Wheeler). Scientific American, Vol. 264, No. 6, pp. 36, 38. https://www.jstor.org/stable/24936938
- Horgan J. (February 1992) The Mephistopheles of Neurobiology (Profile: Francis H. C. Crick). Scientific American, Vol. 266, No. 2, pp. 32–35. https://www.jstor.org/stable/24938937
- Horgan J. (March 1992) The Lonely Odysseus of Particle Physics (Profile: Murray Gell-Mann). Scientific American, Vol. 266, No. 3, pp. 30–32. https://www.jstor.org/stable/24938978
- Horgan J. (July 1992) Quantum Philosophy (Trends in Physics). Scientific American, Vol. 267, No. 1, pp. 94–104. pdf
- Horgan J. (October 1993) The Death of Proof (Trends in Mathematics). Scientific American, Vol. 269, No. 4, pp. 92–103. pdf
- Horgan J. (February 1994) Particle Metaphysics (Trends in Physics). Scientific American, Vol. 270, No. 2, pp. 96–106. pdf
- Horgan J. (September 2006) The Final Frontier: Are We Reaching the Limits of Science? Discover. https://www.discovermagazine.com/the-sciences/the-final-frontier-are-we-reaching-the-limits-of-science
- Horgan J. (June 2008) The Consciousness Conundrum. IEEE Spectrum. https://spectrum.ieee.org/the-consciousness-conundrum
- Horgan J. (December 2019) My Top 10 Columns of the Decade. Scientific American. (Column with links)
- Horgan J. (April 2021) Will Quantum Computing Ever Live Up to Its Hype? Scientific American. https://www.scientificamerican.com/article/will-quantum-computing-ever-live-up-to-its-hype/
