= David Crabb =

American actor and writer

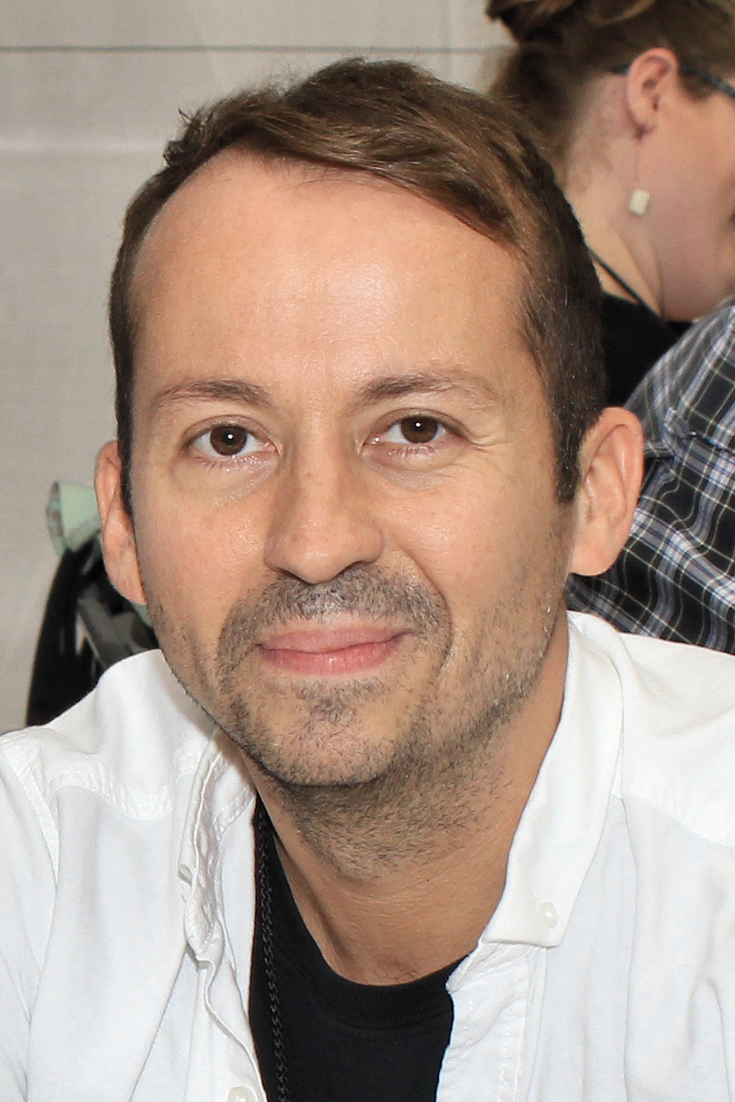
Crabb at the 2016 Texas Book Festival

David Crabb (December 13, 1974 - ) is an American actor and writer. He was born in San Antonio, Texas and lived there until the middle of high school, when he moved to Seguin, Texas. His experiences of being a "gay Goth teen in South Texas" were chronicled in his 2011 autobiographical one-man show, Bad Kid. Bad Kid ran for several weeks at the Axis Theater in New York City in November 2011 and garnered critical praise. It made a second run from February 17, 2012, to March 10, 2012, and garnered more positive reviews from the New York theater community. Bad Kid was published as a memoir by Harper Perennial in 2015.
