= Susan Blackmore =

British writer and academic (born 1951)

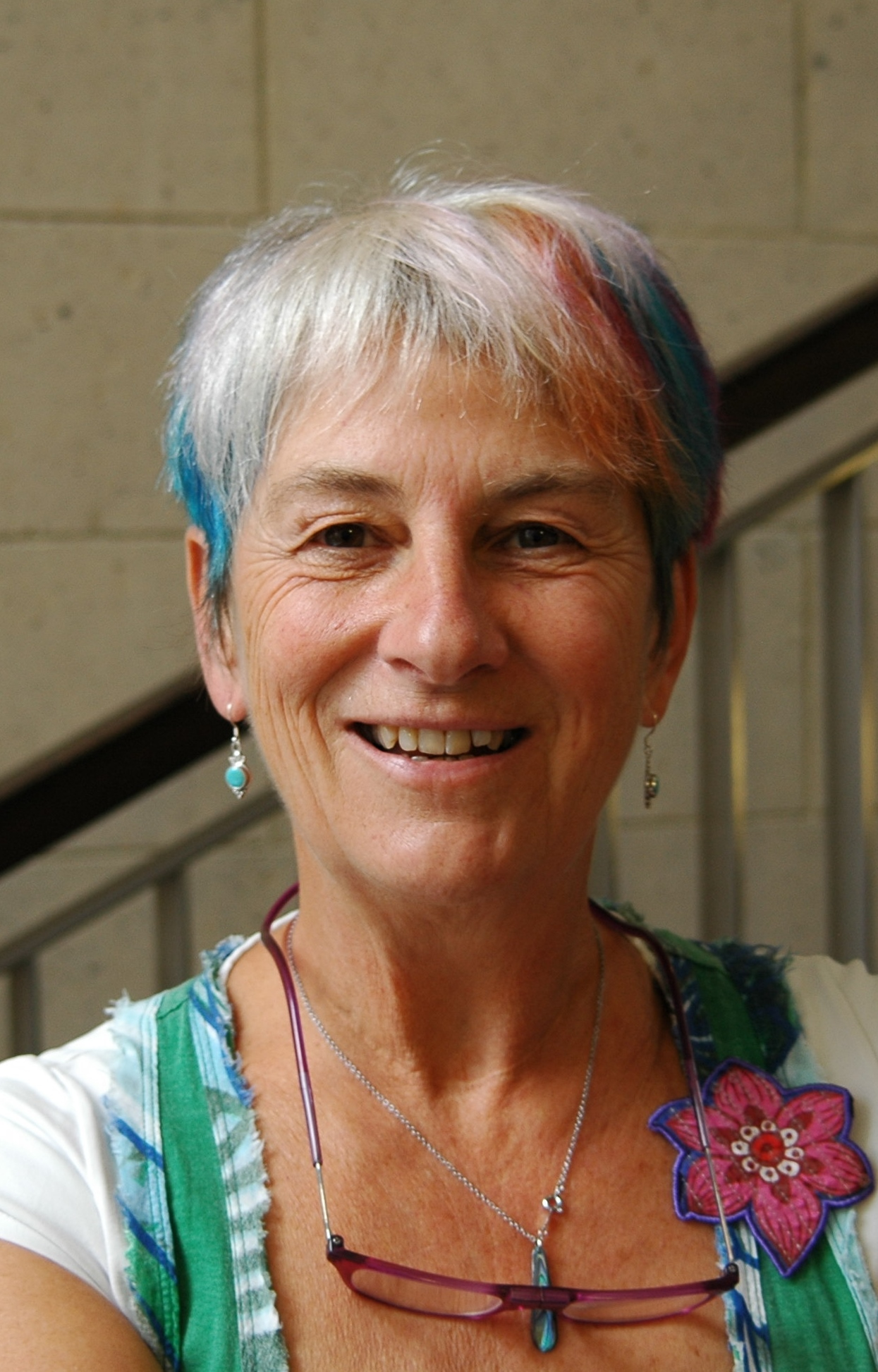
- Blackmore in 2014
- Born: Susan Jane Blackmore; 29 July 1951 (age 75); London, England, U.K.
- Education: St Hilda's College, Oxford; University of Surrey
- Occupations: Freelance writer, lecturer, broadcaster
- Spouses: Tom Troscianko (m. 1977; div. 2009) Adam Hart-Davis (m. 2010)
- Children: 2
- Website: www.susanblackmore.co.uk

Notes
- Susan Blackmore's voice Recorded October 2016

Susan Jane Blackmore (born 29 July 1951) is a British writer, lecturer, sceptic, broadcaster, and a visiting professor at the University of Plymouth. Her fields of research include memetics, parapsychology, consciousness, and she is best known for her book The Meme Machine. She has written or contributed to over 40 books and 60 scholarly articles and is a contributor to The Guardian newspaper.

== Career ==
In 1973, Susan Blackmore graduated from St Hilda's College, Oxford, with a BA (Hons) degree in psychology and physiology. She received an MSc in environmental psychology in 1974 from the University of Surrey. In 1980, she earned a PhD in parapsychology from the same university; her doctoral thesis was titled "Extrasensory Perception as a Cognitive Process." In the 1980s, Blackmore conducted psychokinesis experiments to see if her baby daughter, Emily, could influence a random number generator. The experiments were mentioned in the book to accompany the TV series Arthur C. Clarke's World of Strange Powers. Blackmore taught at the University of the West of England in Bristol until 2001. After spending time in research on parapsychology and the paranormal, her attitude towards the field moved from belief to scepticism. In 1987, Blackmore wrote that she had an out-of-body experience shortly after she began running the Oxford University Society for Psychical Research (OUSPR):

Within a few weeks I had not only learned a lot about the occult and the paranormal, but I had an experience that was to have a lasting effect on me—an out-of-body experience (OBE). It happened while I was wide awake, sitting talking to friends. It lasted about three hours and included everything from a typical "astral projection," complete with a silver cord and duplicate body, to free-floating flying, and finally to a mystical experience. It was clear to me that the doctrine of astral projection, with its astral bodies floating about on astral planes, was intellectually unsatisfactory. But to dismiss the experience as "just imagination" would be impossible without being dishonest about how it had felt at the time. It had felt quite real. Everything looked clear and vivid, and I was able to think and speak quite clearly.

In a New Scientist article in 2000, she again wrote of this:

It was just over thirty years ago that I had the dramatic out-of-body experience that convinced me of the reality of psychic phenomena and launched me on a crusade to show those closed-minded scientists that consciousness could reach beyond the body and that death was not the end. Just a few years of careful experiments changed all that. I found no psychic phenomena—only wishful thinking, self-deception, experimental error and, occasionally, fraud. I became a sceptic.

She is a Fellow of the Committee for Skeptical Inquiry (formerly CSICOP) and in 1991, was awarded the CSICOP Distinguished Skeptic Award.

In an article in The Observer on sleep paralysis Barbara Rowland wrote that Blackmore, "carried out a large study between 1996 and 1999 of 'paranormal' experiences, most of which clearly fell within the definition of sleep paralysis."

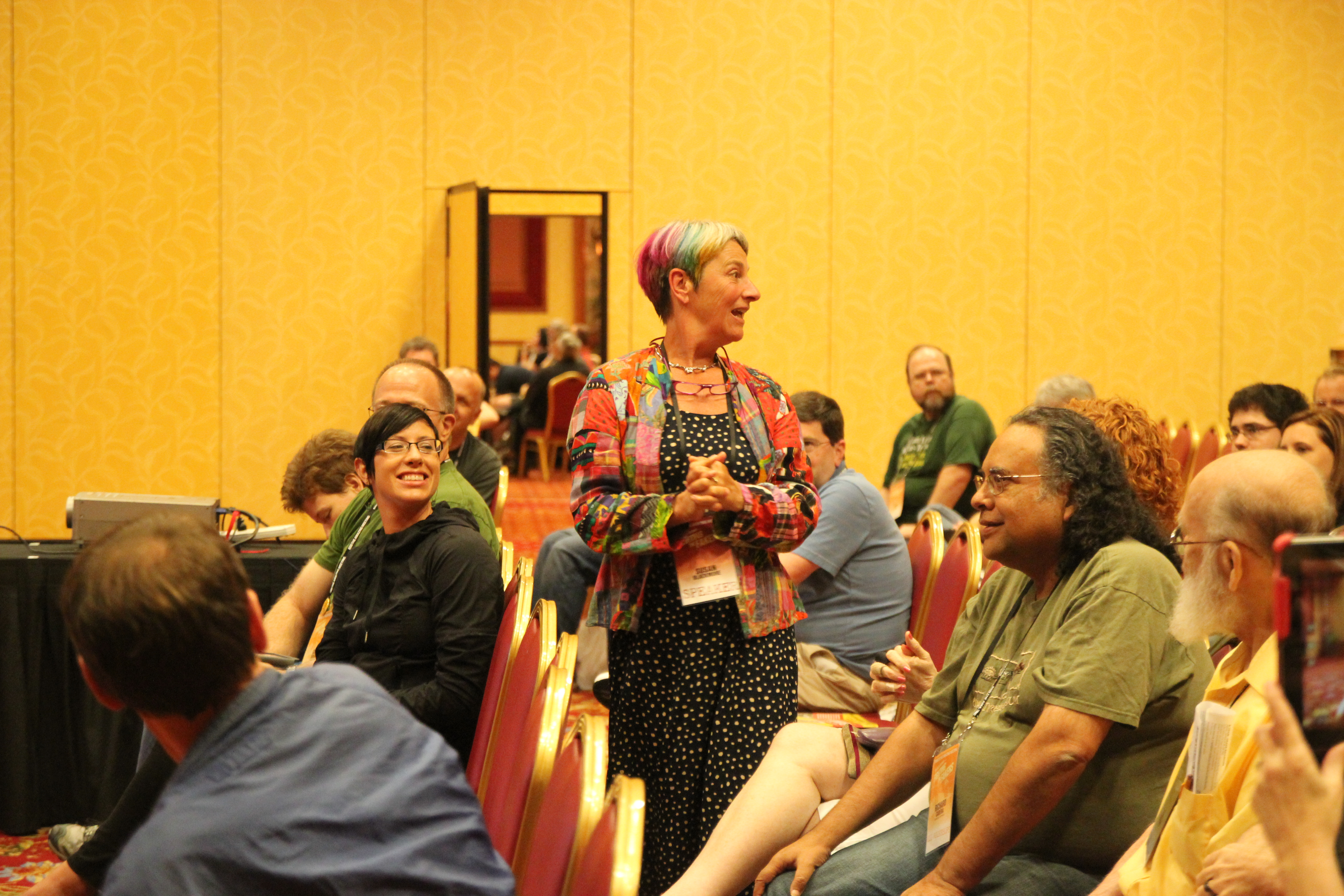
Blackmore at The Amaz!ng Meeting workshop in 2013

Blackmore has done research on memes (which she wrote about in her popular book The Meme Machine) and evolutionary theory. Her book Consciousness: An Introduction (2004), is a textbook that broadly covers the field of consciousness studies. She was on the editorial board for the Journal of Memetics (an electronic journal) from 1997 to 2001, and has been a consulting editor of the Skeptical Inquirer since 1998.

She acted as one of the psychologists who was featured on the British version of the television show Big Brother, speaking about the psychological state of the contestants. She is a Patron of Humanists UK.

Blackmore debated Christian apologist Alister McGrath in 2007, on the existence of God. In 2018 she debated Jordan Peterson on whether God is needed to make sense of life.

In 2017, Blackmore appeared at the 17th European Skeptics Congress (ESC) in Old Town Wrocław, Poland. This congress was organised by the Klub Sceptyków Polskich (Polish Skeptics Club) and Český klub skeptiků Sisyfos (Czech Skeptic's Club). At the congress she joined Scott Lilienfeld, Zbyněk Vybíral and Tomasz Witkowski on a panel on skeptical psychology which was chaired by Michael Heap.

== Memetics and religious culture ==
External videos
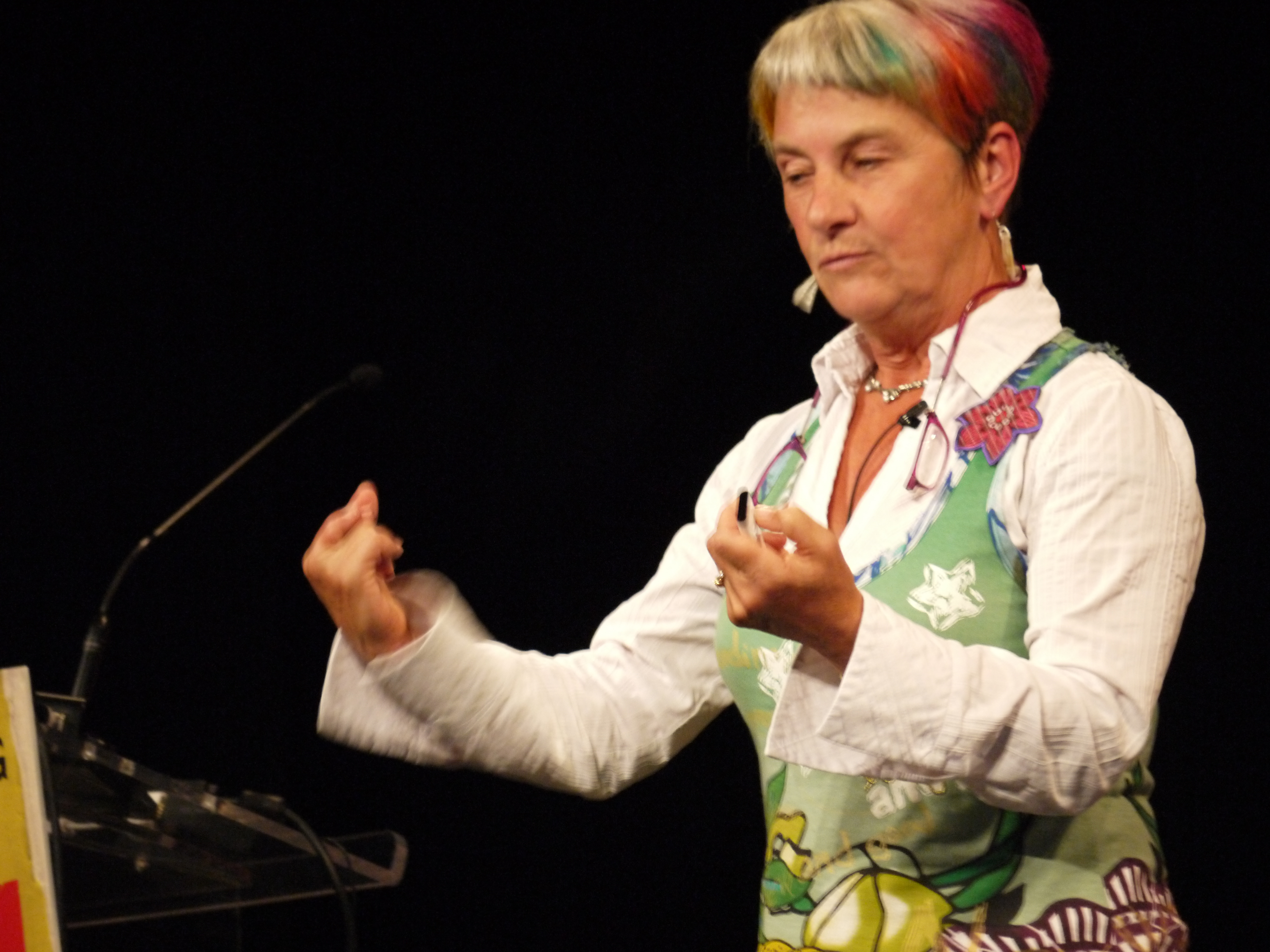
- What are memes?, Web of Stories

Susan Blackmore has made contributions to the field of memetics. The term meme was coined by Richard Dawkins in his 1976 book The Selfish Gene. In his foreword to Blackmore's book The Meme Machine (1999), Dawkins said, "Any theory deserves to be given its best shot, and that is what Susan Blackmore has given the theory of the meme." Other treatments of memes, that cite Blackmore, can be found in the works of Robert Aunger: The Electric Meme, and Jonathan Whitty: A Memetic Paradigm of Project Management.

Blackmore's treatment of memetics insists that memes are true evolutionary replicators, a second replicator that like genetics is subject to the Darwinian algorithm and undergoes evolutionary change. Her prediction on the central role played by imitation as the cultural replicator and the neural structures that must be unique to humans in order to facilitate them have recently been given further support by research on mirror neurons and the differences in extent of these structures between humans and the presumed closest branch of simian ancestors.

At the February 2008 TED conference, Blackmore introduced a special category of memes called temes. Temes are memes which live in technological artifacts instead of the human mind.

Blackmore has written critically about both the flaws and redeeming qualities of religion, having said,

All kinds of infectious memes thrive in religions, in spite of being false, such as the idea of a creator god, virgin births, the subservience of women, transubstantiation, and many more. In the major religions, they are backed up by admonitions to have faith not doubt, and by untestable but ferocious rewards and punishments.

...most religions include at least two aspects which I would be sorry to lose. First is the truths that many contain in their mystical or spiritual traditions; including insights into the nature of self, time and impermanence [...] The other is the rituals that we humans seem to need, marking such events as birth, death, and celebrations. Humanism provides a non-religious alternative and I have found the few such ceremonies I have attended to be a refreshing change from the Christian ones of my upbringing. I am also glad that these ceremonies allow for an eclectic mixture of songs, music and words. In spite of my lack of belief I still enjoy the ancient hymns of my childhood and I know others do too. We can and should build on our traditions rather than throwing out everything along with our childish beliefs.

In September 2010, Blackmore wrote in The Guardian that she no longer refers to religion simply as a "virus of the mind", "unless we twist the concept of a 'virus' to include something helpful and adaptive to its host as well as something harmful, it simply does not apply." Blackmore modified her position when she saw beneficial effects of religion, such as data correlating higher birth rates with the frequency of religious worship, and that "religious people can be more generous, and co-operate more in games such as the Prisoner's Dilemma, and that priming with religious concepts and belief in a 'supernatural watcher' increase the effects".

== Personal life ==
Blackmore is an advocate of secular spirituality, an atheist, a humanist, and a practitioner of Zen, although she identifies herself as "not a Buddhist" because she is not prepared to go along with any dogma. Blackmore is a patron of Humanists UK. She is an honorary associate of the National Secular Society.

On 15 September 2010, Blackmore, along with 54 other public figures, signed an open letter published in The Guardian, stating their opposition to Pope Benedict XVI's state visit to the UK.

Regarding her personal view on a scientific understanding of consciousness, she considers herself to be an illusionist; she believes phenomenal consciousness is an "illusion" and "grand delusion".

Blackmore married Tom Troscianko in 1977 and divorced him in 2009. They had two children, Emily and Jolyon. She is now married to the writer Adam Hart-Davis. Blackmore endured a bout of chronic fatigue syndrome in 1995.

== Publications ==
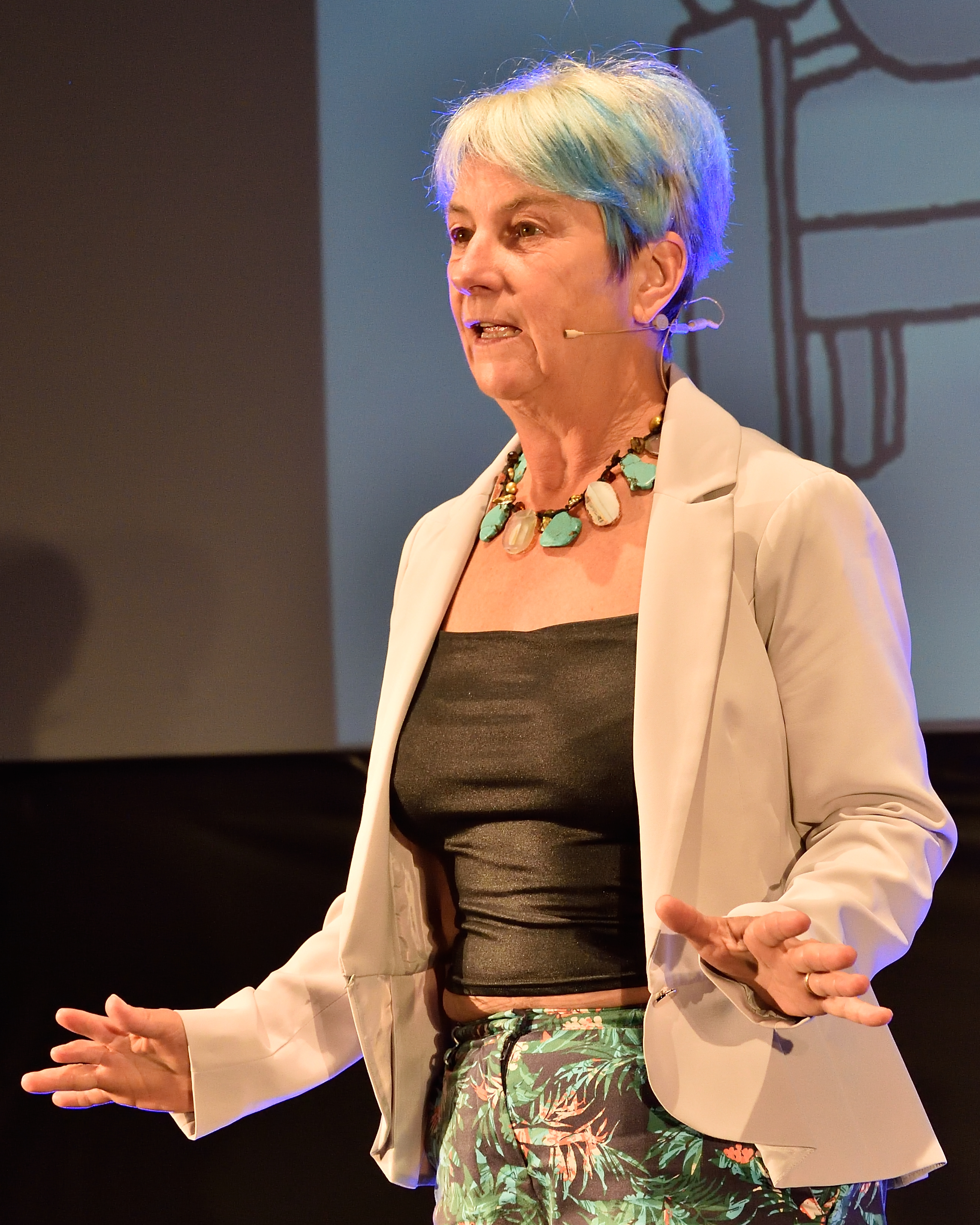
Blackmore at QED 2016 talking about out-of-body experiences

=== Books ===
- —; Troscianko, E. (2024). Consciousness: An Introduction, (4th ed.). Abingdon: Routledge, 2024. ISBN 9781032292564. ISBN 9781032292571. ISBN 9781003300687. doi:10.4324/9781003300687.
- —; Troscianko, E. (2018). Consciousness: An Introduction, (3rd ed.). London, Routledge. 2018. ISBN 1138801313. ISBN 9781317625865. OCLC 1008770304.
- Seeing Myself : the new science of out-of-body experiences. 2018. ROBINSON. ISBN 147213737X. OCLC 1015243143.
- Consciousness: A Very Short Introduction. Very Short Introductions. Oxford University Press. 2017 (2nd Ed). ISBN 978-0198794738. ISBN 0198794738
- Consciousness: An Introduction, (2nd Ed). New York, Oxford University Press, Feb 2011, pb ISBN 0199739099
- Zen and the Art of Consciousness, Oxford, Oneworld Publications (2011), ISBN 185168798X
- Consciousness: An Introduction (2nd Ed). London, Hodder Education (2010) . doi:10.4324/9780203783986. ISBN 144410487X
- Ten Zen Questions. Oxford: Oneworld Publications. 2009. ISBN 978-1-85168-642-1. (paperback). ISBN 185168798X.
- Conversations on Consciousness. Oxford University Press. 2005. ISBN 978-0-19-160486-7.
- Consciousness: A Very Short Introduction. Oxford University Press. 2005. ISBN 978-0-19-157805-2.
- Consciousness: An Introduction (1st ed.). London: Hodder & Stoughton. 2003. ISBN 978-0-340-80909-9. (US ed.) ISBN 9780195153439.
- The Meme Machine (1st ed.). Oxford University Press. 1999. ISBN 978-0-19-850365-1.
- —; Hart-Davis, Adam (1995). Test your psychic powers (1st ed.). London: Thorsons. ISBN 978-1-85538-441-5. (US ed.). ISBN 0806996692.
- Dying to Live: Science and the Near-death Experience. London: Grafton. 1993. ISBN 978-0-586-09212-5. (US ed.). ISBN 0879758708.
- The Adventures of a Parapsychologist (1st ed.). Buffalo, NY: Prometheus. 1986. ISBN 978-0-87975-360-3. (2nd ed. revised). ISBN 9781573920612.
- Beyond the Body: An Investigation of Out-of-the-Body Experiences (1st ed.). London: Heinemann. 1982. ISBN 978-0-434-07470-9. (2nd ed.). ISBN 978089733-3443.
- Parapsychology and out-of-the-body experiences. Hove, England: Transpersonal Books. 1978. ISBN 978-0-906326-01-5.

=== Selected articles ===
- "A psychological theory of the out-of-body experience". Journal of Parapsychology. 48 (3): 201–18. September 1984.
- —; Trościanko, T. (November 1985). "Belief in the paranormal: Probability judgements, illusory control, and the 'chance baseline shift'". British Journal of Psychology. 76 (4): 459–68. doi:10.1111/j.2044-8295.1985.tb01969.x.
- — (1987). "Where am I? Perspectives in imagery and the out-of-body experience". Journal of Mental Imagery. 11 (2): 53–66.
- —; Brelstaff, G.; Nelson, K.; Trościanko, T. (1995). "Is the richness of our visual world an illusion? Transsaccadic memory for complex scenes". Perception. 24 (9): 1075–81. doi:10.1068/p241075. PMID 8552459. S2CID 28031132.
- — (February 1996). "Near-death experiences". Journal of the Royal Society of Medicine. 89 (2): 73–6. doi:10.1177/014107689608900204. PMC 1295660. PMID 8683504.
- — (November 1997). "Probability misjudgment and belief in the paranormal: A newspaper survey". British Journal of Psychology. 88 (4): 683–9. doi:10.1111/j.2044-8295.1997.tb02665.x.
- — (1998). "Imitation and the definition of a meme". Journal of Memetics - Evolutionary Models of Information Transmission. 2 (2): 159–70.
- Bull, L.; Holland, O.; — (2000). "On Meme–Gene Coevolution". Artificial Life. 6 (3): 227–35. doi:10.1162/106454600568852. PMID 11224917. S2CID 7638207.
- — (2001). "Evolution and Memes: The human brain as a selective imitation device". Cybernetics and Systems. 32 (1–2): 225–55. doi:10.1080/019697201300001867. S2CID 9112642.
- — (2002). "There Is No Stream of Consciousness. What is all this? What is all this stuff around me; This stream of experiences that I seem to be having all the time?". Journal of Consciousness Studies. 9 (5–6): 17–28.
