= The Human Zoo (book) =

Book by Desmond Morris

- Author: Desmond Morris
- Language: English
- Genre: Non-fiction
- Publication date: 1969
- ISBN: 1568361041
- Preceded by: The Naked Ape

The Human Zoo is a book written by the British zoologist Desmond Morris, published in 1969. It is a follow-up to his earlier book The Naked Ape; both books examine how the biological nature of the human species has shaped the character of the cultures of the contemporary world.

The Human Zoo examines the nature of civilised society, especially in the cities. Morris compares the human inhabitants of a city to the animal inhabitants of a zoo, which have their survival needs provided for, but at the cost of living in an unnatural environment. Humans in their cities, and animals in their zoos, both have food and shelter provided for them, and have considerable free time on their hands. But they have to live in an unnatural environment, and are both likely to have problems in developing healthy social relationships, both are liable to suffer from isolation and boredom, and both live in a limited amount of physical space. The book explains how the inhabitants of cities and zoos have invented ways to deal with these problems, and the consequences that follow when they fail at dealing with them.

From this point of view, Morris examines why civilised society is the way it is. He offers explanations of the best and the worst features of civilised society. He examines the magnificent achievements of civilised society, the sublime explorations that make up science and the humanities, as well as the horrible behaviours of this same society such as war, slavery and rape. This book, and Morris's earlier book The Naked Ape, are two of the early works in the field of sociobiology, which have both contributed much to contemporary understandings of society.
