= The Moral Animal =

1994 book by Robert Wright

- Cover of the first edition
- Author: Robert Wright
- Language: English
- Subjects: Social evolution, Evolutionary psychology, Morality, Ethics
- Publisher: Vintage Books
- Publication date: 1994
- Publication place: United States
- Media type: Print (Hardcover and Paperback)
- Pages: 466 pages (paperback)
- ISBN: 0-679-76399-6 (1st edition, hardcover)
- OCLC: 33496013

The Moral Animal is a 1994 book by journalist Robert Wright, in which the author explores many aspects of everyday life through evolutionary biology.

== Summary ==
Wright explores many aspects of everyday life through evolutionary biology. He provides Darwinian explanations for human behavior and psychology, social dynamics and structures, as well as people's relationships with lovers, friends, and family.

Wright borrows extensively from Charles Darwin's better-known publications, including On the Origin of Species (1859), but also from his chronicles and personal writings, illustrating behavioral principles with Darwin's own biographical examples.

== Reception ==
The Moral Animal was a national bestseller and has been published in 12 languages; The New York Times Book Review chose it as one of its eleven Best Books of 1994. The linguist Steven Pinker praised The Moral Animal as a "fiercely intelligent, beautifully written and engrossingly original book" but "found his [Wright's] larger ethical arguments problematic." Neurologist Amy Wax wrote: "One measure of his [Wright's] success is that most of the incoherences in the book can be traced to weaknesses in the body of work he seeks to present, and not in Wright's exposition." The paleontologist Stephen Jay Gould wrote that The Moral Animal presents "pure guesswork" as science, and that the book owes its impact to "good writing and egregiously simplistic argument."

== See also ==
- Evolutionary ethics
- Evolutionary psychology
- John Stuart Mill
- Kin selection
- Reciprocal altruism
- Richard Dawkins
- Steven Pinker
- The Naked Ape

== Bibliographical information ==
- Robert Wright (1995). The Moral Animal: Why We Are, the Way We Are: The New Science of Evolutionary Psychology. Vintage. ISBN 978-0-679-76399-4.
