= Robert Wright (journalist) =

American journalist and author (born 1957)

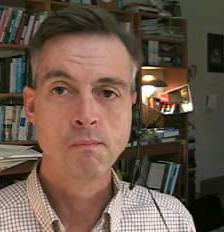
- Wright in 2007
- Born: January 15, 1957 (age 69); Lawton, Oklahoma, U.S.
- Other name: Bob Wright
- Education: Princeton University
- Notable credit(s): The Moral Animal, Nonzero, The Evolution of God
- Spouse: Lisa Wright
- Children: 2
- Website: bloggingheads.tv meaningoflife.tv nonzero.substack.com

Robert Wright (born January 15, 1957) is an American author and journalist known for his wide-ranging interests in philosophy, society, science (especially evolutionary psychology), history, politics, international relations, and religion. He has published five books: Three Scientists and Their Gods: Looking for Meaning in an Age of Information (1988), The Moral Animal (1994), Nonzero: The Logic of Human Destiny (1999), The Evolution of God (2009), and Why Buddhism is True (2017). Wright has taught at Princeton University and the University of Pennsylvania; more recently, in 2019 he was Visiting Professor of Science and Religion at Union Theological Seminary, New York.

In addition to teaching, lecturing, books, and journalism, Wright has been an innovator in the development of content on the Internet. He is the co-founder and editor-in-chief of Bloggingheads.tv, the founder and editor-in-chief of Meaningoflife.tv, the founder and chief correspondent of the Nonzero Newsletter and Nonzero Podcast, and the creator of the Nonzero Foundation.

== Early life and education ==
Wright was born in Lawton, Oklahoma, into a Southern Baptist family and attended public secondary schools in San Francisco, California, and San Antonio, Texas. A self-described "Army brat", Wright attended Texas Christian University for a year in the late 1970s, before transferring to Princeton University, where he studied sociobiology, a precursor to evolutionary psychology. His teachers at Princeton included author John McPhee, whose style influenced Wright's first book, Three Scientists and Their Gods: Looking for Meaning in an Age of Information.

== Career ==
=== Journalism ===
Wright was employed as Senior Editor at The Sciences and The New Republic, and as an editor at The Wilson Quarterly. As a contributing editor at The New Republic, he co-authored the "TRB" column. He has also worked at Time, and Slate, and has written for The Atlantic Monthly, The New Yorker, and The New York Times Magazine. He has occasionally contributed to The New York Times, putting in a stint as guest columnist in April 2007 and in 2010 acting as a contributor to The Opinionator, a web-only opinion page. Wright assumed the title of senior editor of The Atlantic on January 1, 2012. In February 2015 the magazine's author page describes him as "a former senior editor at The Atlantic."

=== University teaching and research ===
In early 2000s, Wright taught occasionally at Princeton University and the University of Pennsylvania, leading a graduate seminar called "Religion and Human Nature" and teaching an undergraduate course called "The Evolution of Religion." At Princeton, Wright was a Laurence S. Rockefeller Visiting Fellow and co-taught a graduate seminar with Peter Singer on the biological basis of moral intuition. In 2014, Wright taught a six-week Coursera MOOC on "Buddhism and Modern Psychology". In 2019, Wright was a Visiting Professor of Science and Religion at Union Theological Seminary, New York. Also in 2019, Wright was a Senior Fellow at the think tank New America.

=== Meaningoflife.tv ===
In 2002, Wright ventured into video-on-Internet with his MeaningofLife.tv website, developed by Greg Dingle, where he interviewed a range of thinkers on their ideas about science, philosophy, meditation, spirituality, and other topics. Meaningoflife.tv is sponsored by Slate magazine, and made possible through funding by the Templeton Foundation. Other hosts include John Horgan, Daniel Kaufman, Nikita Petrov, and Aryeh Cohen-Wade.

=== Bloggingheads.tv ===
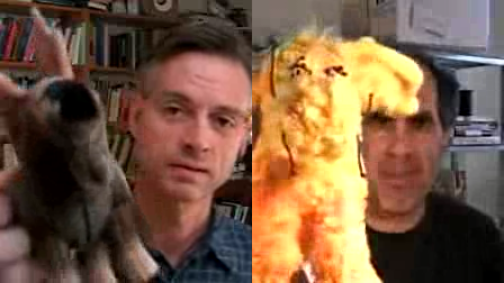
Wright and Mickey Kaus comparing stuffed moose visual aids on Bloggingheads.tv

On November 1, 2005, Wright, blogger Mickey Kaus, and Greg Dingle launched Bloggingheads.tv, a current-events diavlog. Bloggingheads diavlogs are conducted via webcam, and can be viewed online or downloaded either as WMV or MP4 video files or as MP3 sound files. New diavlogs are posted approximately 5-10 times a week and are archived. While many diavlogs feature Wright, other hosts at Bloggingheads.tv include Glenn Loury, John McWhorter, Bill Scher, Matt Lewis, Kat Rosenfield, Phoebe Maltz-Bovy, and Aryeh Cohen-Wade.

== Views on religion ==
Wright has written extensively on the topic of religion, particularly in The Evolution of God. In 2009, When asked by Bill Moyers if God is a figment of the human imagination, Wright responded:

I would say so. Now, I don't think that precludes the possibility that as ideas about God have evolved people have moved closer to something that may be the truth about ultimate purpose and ultimate meaning... Very early on, apparently, people started imagining sources of causality, imagining things out there making things happen. And early on there were shamans who had mystical experiences that even today a Buddhist monk would say were valid forms of apprehension of the divine or something. But by and large I think people were making up stories that would help them control the world.

On The Colbert Report, Wright said he was "not an atheist" but did not subscribe to any of the three Abrahamic religions. He opposes creationism, including intelligent design. Wright has a materialist conception of natural selection; however, he is intrigued by the possibility of some larger purpose unfolding, natural selection possibly being itself the product of design, in the context of teleology. Wright describes what he calls the "changing moods of God," arguing that religion is adaptable and based on the political, economic, and social circumstances of the culture, rather than strictly scriptural interpretation.

Wright has also been critical of organized atheism. He has described himself as a secular humanist. Wright makes a distinction between religion being wrong and bad and resists the notion that its bad effects necessarily outweigh its good effects. He sees organized atheism as attempting to actively convert people in the same way as many religions do. Wright has said that it is counterproductive to think of religion as being the root cause of today's problems.

In Why Buddhism is True, Wright investigates a secular, Westernized form of Buddhism focusing on the practice of mindfulness meditation and stripped of the element of reincarnation. He believes Buddhism's diagnosis of the causes of human suffering is largely vindicated by evolutionary biology and evolutionary psychology, justifying his book's title. He further argues that the modern psychological idea of the modularity of mind resonates with the Buddhist teaching of no-self (anatman).

== Personal life ==
Wright lives in Princeton, New Jersey, with his wife Lisa; they have two daughters. Two of their dogs, named Frazier and Milo, have been featured in Bloggingheads.tv episodes.

== Books ==
- 1989 Three Scientists and Their Gods: Looking for Meaning in an Age of Information. ISBN 0-06-097257-2
- 1994 The Moral Animal: Why We Are the Way We Are: The New Science of Evolutionary Psychology. ISBN 0-679-76399-6
- 1999 Nonzero: The Logic of Human Destiny. ISBN 0-679-75894-1
- 2009 The Evolution of God. Little, Brown and Company. ISBN 0-316-73491-8
- 2017 Why Buddhism is True: The Science and Philosophy of Meditation and Enlightenment. ISBN 1439195455
- 2026 The God Test: Artificial Intelligence and our Coming Cosmic Reckoning. ISBN 978-1-6680-6165-7

== Awards and recognition ==
- The Evolution of God was one of three finalists for the 2010 Pulitzer Prize for General Nonfiction.
- The New York Times Book Review chose Wright's The Moral Animal as one of the ten best books of 1994; it was a national bestseller and has been published in at least twelve languages.
- Nonzero: The Logic of Human Destiny was a The New York Times Book Review Notable Book in the year 2000 and has been published in at least nine languages. Fortune magazine included Nonzero on a list of "the 75 smartest [business-related] books of all time."
- Wright's first book, Three Scientists and Their Gods: Looking for Meaning in an Age of Information, was published in 1988 and was nominated for a National Book Critics Circle Award.
- Wright's column "The Information Age," written for The Sciences magazine, won the National Magazine Award for Essay and Criticism.
