= Philosophy of evolution =

Branch of philosophy of science

The philosophy of evolution is the branch of the philosophy of biology that examines the philosophical implications of evolution and the intersections of evolutionary biology with other fields such as epistemology, ethics, aesthetics, and political philosophy.

Charles Darwin's 1859 On the Origin of Species is usually considered to be the starting point of contemporary understandings of evolution. The history of evolutionary thought extends from antiquity to contemporary developments including the modern evolutionary synthesis, the extended evolutionary synthesis, and universal Darwinism.

== History ==
Evolutionary theory was transformed by Charles Darwin's 1859 On the Origin of Species; until that date the idea of evolutionary progress had been a pseudoscientific view, without evidence to back it.

In the 20th century, evolutionary science underwent the modern evolutionary synthesis, and in the 21st century is undergoing the extended evolutionary synthesis.

Social Spencerism was a misapplication of Darwin's ideas resulting from Spencer's problematic ethics.

== Philosophy ==
=== Definitions ===
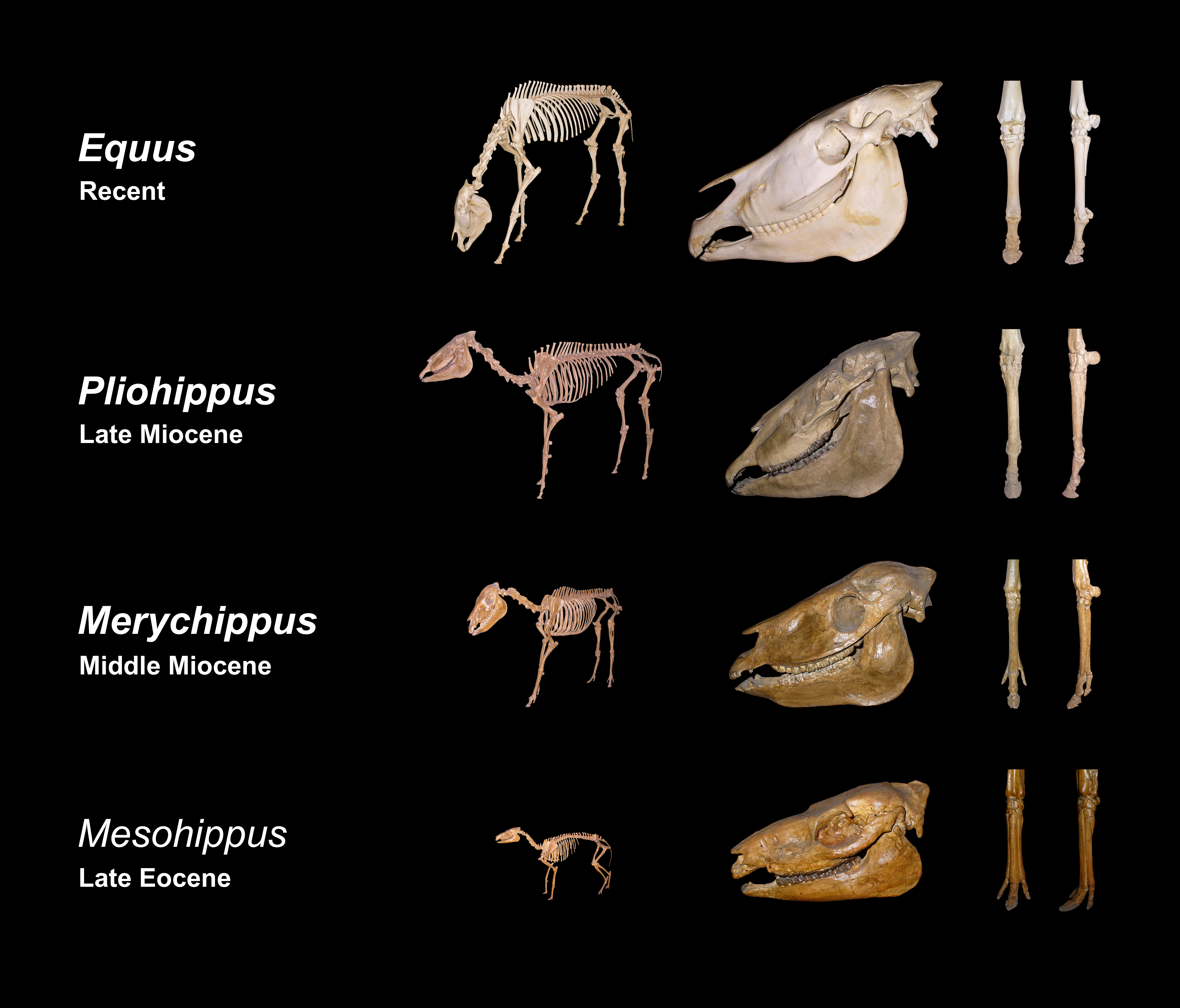
George Gaylord Simpson argued against the naive view that evolution such as of the horse took place in a "straight-line". He noted that any chosen line is one path in a complex branching tree, as natural selection has no imposed direction.

The core of evolution is that everything can change, with variants that are better adapted being selected: but crucially without any sort of overall direction or plan. There is a theory that evolution has a direction and is progressive, orthogenesis. As well as a general popular belief that this is what evolution entails, it has been supported by some biologists, such as the ant expert E. O. Wilson, although it is non-Darwinian.

=== Causes of evolution ===
Philosophers of evolution have debated whether natural selection and other mechanisms of evolution are causes of change, or whether they are merely high-level summaries of the effects of many events such as the deaths of specific individuals.

=== Units of evolution ===
Another area of debate is the unit of evolution. Selection is often seen as applying at the level of the individual organism (a problematic concept), but cases can be made for selection at lower levels such as the gene, or at higher levels such as groups that live together, but rarely if ever at the level of whole species.

=== Altruism ===
Debate has continued over the evolution of altruism, behaviour which may be harmful to the individual that practises it, but beneficial to others. Proposed explanations have again centred on whether evolution takes place at the level of individuals or of groups. Kin selection proposes that altruism should evolve when closely related individuals live together.

== Subdomains ==
Sub-domains of the philosophy of evolution include its epistemology, its logic, and its metaphysics.

=== Evolutionary epistemology ===
Evolutionary epistemology was discussed by Donald T. Campbell in his 1974 essay "Evolutionary Epistemology", part of the 2-volume book The Philosophy of Karl Popper. It is a naturalistic approach to epistemology, part of the philosophy of science. It subscribes to the idea that cognition is primarily a product of biological evolution. Campbell's 1974 essay "Evolutionary Epistemology" develops a selectionist theory of human creativity. The creativity science scholar Dean Keith Simonton has contributed significantly to evolutionary epistemology. He proposed a Darwinian model of the psychology of scientific discovery, refining Campbell's BVSR (blind variation and selective retention) model.

=== Evolutionary logic ===
Evolutionary logic is a theory of rationality where logical law emerges as an intrinsic aspect of evolutionary biology. William S. Cooper, in his 2001 book The Evolution of Reason: Logic as a Branch of Biology, illustrates how logical rules are derived directly from evolutionary principles.

Evolution as computation is a concept explored by John Mayfield in his 2013 book The Engine of Complexity: Evolution as Computation. He synthesizes core concepts from multiple disciplines to offer a new approach to understanding how evolution works, and how complex organisms, structures, organizations, and social orders can and do arise, based on information theory and computational science.

=== Evolutionary metaphysics ===
Evolutionary metaphysics is a perspective that views metaphysical concepts through the lens of evolutionary biology. John Dupré, in his work published in Interface Focus (2017) and elsewhere, explores the implications of process metaphysics for conceptualizing evolution.

== Applications in other domains ==
Philosophy of evolution intersects with other domains, including ethics, aesthetics and the arts, and political philosophy.

=== Evolutionary ethics ===
Evolutionary ethics examines the implications of evolutionary biology for ethical theories. Evolutionary philosopher Michael Bradie has made significant contributions to this field.

David Sloan Wilson's (2019) nonfiction book This View of Life and his satirical novel Atlas Hugged (2021) both examine evolutionary ethics, exploring prosocial behavior (altruism) versus selfish behavior.

=== Evolutionary aesthetics and the arts ===
Evolutionary aesthetics is the study of art from a biological point of view. Science, arts and humanities scholars on evolutionary aesthetics include Edward O. Wilson, Denis Dutton, Joseph Carroll, Brian Boyd, Steven Pinker, Jonathan Gottschall, and Ellen Dissanayake.

Psychologist Mihaly Csikszentmihalyi's evolutionary sociocultural systems model of creativity is an explicitly Darwinian evolutionary model of the variation, selection, and transmission of creative (new, useful, and surprising) units of culture, in all domains in culture.

=== Evolutionary political philosophy ===
Evolutionary political philosophy applies the principles of evolution to the study of political systems. Karl Popper's (1945) book The Open Society and its Enemies presents an evolutionary approach to political philosophy, as does David Sloan Wilson's (2019) book This View of Life: Completing the Darwinian Revolution.

The Handbook of Biology and Politics (2017) examines biopolitics and the intersection of evolutionary biology and political science. The edited volume brings together research applying evolutionary and biological insights, to better understand political behaviors, institutions, ideologies and social dynamics.

=== Applied evolutionary epistemology ===
From 2012 to 2024 Nathalie Gontier was founder and director of AppEEL, the Applied Evolutionary Epistemology Lab, an international group of scholars working in applied evolutionary epistemology.

In the 2012 article "Applied Evolutionary Epistemology: A New Methodology to Enhance Interdisciplinary Research Between the Life and Human Sciences", Gontier explains how AEE's research program aims to identify: "the units, levels, and mechanisms of biological and sociocultural evolution".

A 2021 article by Gontier and Michael Bradie examines evolutionary epistemology as "two research avenues, three schools, and a single and shared agenda".

== Cited sources ==
- Bowler, Peter J. (2003). Evolution: The History of an Idea. University of California Press. ISBN 978-0-520-23693-6.
- Larson, Edward J. (2004). Evolution: The Remarkable History of a Scientific Theory. Modern Library Chronicles. Vol. 17. New York: Modern Library. ISBN 978-0-679-64288-6.
- Ruse, Michael (1996). Monad to man: the Concept of Progress in Evolutionary Biology. Harvard University Press. ISBN 978-0-674-03248-4.
