= Darwinian literary studies =

Branch of literary criticism

Darwinian literary studies (also known as literary Darwinism) is a branch of literary criticism that studies literature in the context of evolution by means of natural selection, including gene-culture coevolution. It represents an emerging trend of neo-Darwinian thought in intellectual disciplines beyond those traditionally considered as evolutionary biology: evolutionary psychology, evolutionary anthropology, behavioral ecology, evolutionary developmental psychology, cognitive psychology, affective neuroscience, behavioural genetics, evolutionary epistemology, and other such disciplines.

== History and scope ==
Interest in the relationship between Darwinism and the study of literature began in the nineteenth century, for example, among Italian literary critics. For example, Ugo Angelo Canello argued that literature was the history of the human psyche, and as such, played a part in the struggle for natural selection, while Francesco de Sanctis argued that Emile Zola "brought the concepts of natural selection, struggle for existence, adaptation and environment to bear in his novels".

Modern Darwinian literary studies arose in part as a result of its proponents' dissatisfaction with the poststructuralist and postmodernist philosophies that had come to dominate literary study during the 1970s and 1980s. In particular, the Darwinists took issue with the argument that discourse constructs reality. The Darwinists argue that biologically grounded dispositions constrain and inform discourse. This argument runs counter to what evolutionary psychologists assert is the central idea in the "Standard Social Science Model": that culture wholly constitutes human values and behaviors.

Literary Darwinists use concepts from evolutionary biology and the evolutionary human sciences to formulate principles of literary theory and interpret literary texts. They investigate interactions between human nature and the forms of cultural imagination, including literature and its oral antecedents. By "human nature", they mean a pan-human, genetically transmitted set of dispositions: motives, emotions, features of personality, and forms of cognition. Because the Darwinists concentrate on relations between genetically transmitted dispositions and specific cultural configurations, they often describe their work as "biocultural critique".

Many literary Darwinists aim not just at creating another "approach" or "movement" in literary theory; they aim at fundamentally altering the paradigm within which literary study is now conducted. They want to establish a new alignment among the disciplines and ultimately to encompass all other possible approaches to literary study. They rally to Edward O. Wilson's cry for "consilience" among all the branches of learning. Like Wilson, they envision nature as an integrated set of elements and forces extending in an unbroken chain of material causation from the lowest level of subatomic particles to the highest levels of cultural imagination. And like Wilson, they regard evolutionary biology as the pivotal discipline uniting the hard sciences with the social sciences and the humanities. They believe that humans have evolved in an adaptive relation to their environment. They argue that for humans, as for all other species, evolution has shaped the anatomical, physiological, and neurological characteristics of the species, and they think that human behavior, feeling, and thought are fundamentally shaped by those characteristics. They make it their business to consult evolutionary biology and evolutionary social science in order to determine what those characteristics are, and they bring that information to bear on their understanding of the products of the human imagination.

Evolutionary literary criticism of a minimalist kind consists in identifying basic, common human needs—survival, sex, and status, for instance—and using those categories to describe the behavior of characters depicted in literary texts. Others pose for themselves a form of criticism involving an overarching interpretive challenge: to construct continuous explanatory sequences linking the highest level of causal evolutionary explanation to the most particular effects in individual works of literature. Within evolutionary biology, the highest level of causal explanation involves adaptation by means of natural selection. Starting from the premise that the human mind has evolved in an adaptive relation to its environment, literary Darwinists undertake to characterize the phenomenal qualities of a literary work (tone, style, theme, and formal organization), locate the work in a cultural context, explain that cultural context as a particular organization of the elements of human nature within a specific set of environmental conditions (including cultural traditions), identify an implied author and an implied reader, examine the responses of actual readers (for instance, other literary critics), describe the socio-cultural, political, and psychological functions the work fulfills, locate those functions in relation to the evolved needs of human nature, and link the work comparatively with other artistic works, using a taxonomy of themes, formal elements, affective elements, and functions derived from a comprehensive model of human nature.

Contributors to evolutionary studies in literature have included humanists, biologists, and social scientists. Some of the biologists and social scientists have adopted primarily discursive methods for discussing literary subjects, and some of the humanists have adopted the empirical, quantitative methods typical of research in the sciences. Literary scholars and scientists have also collaborated in research that combines the methods typical of work in the humanities with methods typical of work in the sciences.

== Adaptive function of literature and the arts ==
The most hotly debated issue in evolutionary literary study concerns the adaptive functions of literature and other arts—whether there are any adaptive functions, and if so, what they might be. Proposed functions include transmitting information, including about kin relations, and by providing the audience with a model and rehearsal for how to behave in similar situations that may arise in the future. Steven Pinker (How the Mind Works, 1997) suggests that aesthetic responsiveness is merely a side effect of cognitive powers that evolved to fulfill more practical functions, but Pinker also suggests that narratives can provide information for adaptively relevant problems. Geoffrey Miller (The Mating Mind, 2000) argues that artistic productions in the ancestral environment served as forms of sexual display in order to demonstrate fitness and attract mates, similarly to the function of the peacock's tail. Brian Boyd (On the Origin of Stories, 2009) argues that the arts are forms of cognitive "play" that enhance pattern recognition. In company with Ellen Dissanayake (Art and Intimacy, 2000), Boyd also argues that the arts provide means of creating shared social identity and help create and maintain human bonding. Dissanayake, Joseph Carroll (Literary Darwinism 2004), and Denis Dutton (The Art Instinct, 2009) all argue that the arts help organize the human mind by giving emotionally and aesthetically modulated models of reality. By participating in the simulated life of other people one gains a greater understanding of the motivations of oneself and other people. The idea that the arts function as means of psychological organization subsumes the ideas that the arts provide adaptively relevant information, enable us to consider alternative behavioral scenarios, enhance pattern recognition, and serve as means for creating shared social identity. And of course, the arts can be used for sexual display. In that respect, the arts are like most other human products—clothing, jewelry, shelter, means of transportation, etc. The hypothesis that the arts help organize the mind is not incompatible with the hypothesis of sexual display, but it subordinates sexual display to a more primary adaptive function.

== Hypotheses about formal literary features ==
Some Darwinists have proposed explanations for formal literary features, including genres. Poetic meter has been attributed to a biologically based three-second metric. Gender preferences for pornography and romance novels have been explained by sexual selection. Different genres have been conjectured to correspond to different basic emotions: tragedy corresponding to sadness, fear, and anger; comedy to joy and surprise; and satire to anger, disgust, and contempt. Tragedy has also been associated with status conflict and comedy with mate selection. The satiric dystopian novel has been explained by contrasting universal human needs and oppressive state organization.

== Distinguishing literary Darwinism ==
Cosmic evolutionism and evolutionary analogism: Literary Theorists who would call themselves "literary Darwinists" or claim some close alignment with the literary Darwinists share one central idea: that the adapted mind produces literature and that literature reflects the structure and character of the adapted mind. There are at least two other ways of integrating evolution into literary theory: cosmic evolutionism and evolutionary analogism. Cosmic evolutionists identify some universal process of development or progress and identify literary structures as microcosmic versions of that process. Proponents of cosmic evolution include Frederick Turner, Alex Argyros, and Richard Cureton. Evolutionary analogists take the process of Darwinian evolution—blind variation and selective retention—as a widely applicable model for all development. The psychologist Donald Campbell advances the idea that all intellectual creativity can be conceived as a form of random variation and selective retention. Rabkin and Simon offer an instance in literary study. They argue that cultural creations "evolve in the same way as do biological organisms, that is, as complex adaptive systems that succeed or fail according to their fitness to their environment." Other critics or theorists who have some affiliation with evolutionary biology but who would not identify themselves as literary Darwinists include William Benzon (Beethoven's Anvil) and William Flesch (Comeuppance).

Cognitive rhetoric: Practitioners of "cognitive rhetoric" or cognitive poetics affiliate themselves with certain language-centered areas of cognitive psychology. The chief theorists in this school argue that language is based in metaphors, and they claim that metaphors are themselves rooted in biology or the body, but they do not argue that human nature consists in a highly structured set of motivational and cognitive dispositions that have evolved through an adaptive process regulated by natural selection. Cognitive rhetoricians are generally more anxious than literary Darwinists to associate themselves with postmodern theories of "discourse," but some cognitive rhetoricians make gestures toward evolutionary psychology, and some critics closely affiliated with evolutionary psychology have found common ground with the cognitive rhetoricians. The seminal authorities in cognitive rhetoric are the language philosophers Mark Johnson and George Lakoff. The most prominent literary theorist in the field is Mark Turner. Other literary scholars associated with cognitive rhetoric include Mary Thomas Crane, F. Elizabeth Hart, Tony Jackson, Alan Richardson, Ellen Spolsky, Francis Steen, and Lisa Zunshine.

== Critical commentaries ==
Some of the commentaries included in the special double issue of Style are critical of literary Darwinism. Other critical commentaries include those of William Benzon, "Signposts for a Naturalist Criticism," (Entelechy: Mind & Culture, Fall 2005/Winter 2006); William Deresiewicz, "Adaptation: On Literary Darwinism," The Nation June 8, 2009: 26-31; William Flesch, Comeuppance: Costly Signaling, Altruistic Punishment, and Other Biological Components of Fiction, (Cambridge: Harvard UP, 2008); Eugene Goodheart, Darwinian Misadventures in the Humanities, (New Brunswick: NJ: Transaction, 2007); Jonathan Kramnick, "Against Literary Darwinism," in Critical Inquiry, Winter 2011; "Debating Literary Darwinism," a set of responses to Jonathan Kramnick's essay, along with Kramnick's rejoinder, in Critical Inquiry, Winter 2012; Alan Richardson, "Studies in Literature and Cognition: A Field Map," in The Work of Fiction: Cognition, Culture, and Complexity, ed. Alan Richardson and Ellen Spolsky (Burlington, VT: Ashgate, 2004 1-29); and Lisa Zunshine, "What is Cognitive Cultural Studies?," in Introduction to Cognitive Cultural Studies (Johns Hopkins UP, 2010 1-33). Goodheart and Deresiewicz, adopting a traditional humanist perspective, reject efforts to ground literary study in biology. Richardson disavows the Darwinists' tendency to attack poststructuralism. Richardson and Benzon both align themselves with cognitive science and distinguish that alignment from one with evolutionary psychology. Flesch makes use of evolutionary research on game theory, costly signaling, and altruistic punishment but, like Stephen Jay Gould, professes himself hostile to evolutionary psychology. For a commentary that is sympathetic to evolutionary psychology but skeptical about the possibilities of using it for literary study, see Steven Pinker, "Toward a Consilient Study of Literature," a review of The Literary Animal, Philosophy and Literature 31 (2007): 162-178. David Fishelov has argued that the attempt to link Darwinism to literary studies has failed "to produce compelling evidence to support some of its basic assumptions (notably that literature is an adaptation)" and has called on literary scholars to be more conceptually rigorous when they pursue "empirical research into different aspects of literary evolution." Whitley Kaufman has argued that the Darwinist approach to literature has caused its proponents to misunderstand what is important and great in literature.

== See also ==
- James Arthur Anderson
- Brian Boyd
- Joseph Carroll
- Ellen Dissanayake
- Denis Dutton
- Evolutionary philosophy
- Jonathan Gottschall
- Mathias Clasen
- Evolutionary psychology
- Universal Darwinism

== Bibliography ==
In addition to books oriented specifically to literature, this list includes books on cinema and books by authors who propound theories like those of the literary Darwinists but discuss the arts in general.

- Anderson, James Arthur. 2020. Excavating Stephen King: A Darwinist Hermeneutic Study of the Fiction. Lexington Books.
- Anderson, Joseph. 1996. The Reality of Illusion: An Ecological Approach to Cognitive Film Theory. Southern Illinois Press.
- Austin, Michael. 2010. Useful Fictions: Evolution, Anxiety, and the Origins of Literature. University of Nebraska Press.
- Barash, David P., and Nanelle Barash. 2005. Madame Bovary's Ovaries: A Darwinian Look at Literature. Delacorte Press.
- Blair, Linda Nicole. 2017. Virginia Woolf and the Power of Story: A Literary Darwinist Reading of Six Novels. McFarland.
- Bordwell, David. 2008. Poetics of Cinema. Routledge.
- Boyd, Brian. 2009. On the Origin of Stories: Evolution, Cognition. and Fiction. Harvard University Press.
- Boyd, Brian, Joseph Carroll, and Jonathan Gottschall, eds. 2010. Evolution, Literature, and Film: A Reader. Columbia University Press.
- Canello, Ugo Angelo. 1882. Letteratura e darwinismo: lezioni due. Padova, Tipografia A. Draghi.
- Carroll, Joseph. 1995. Evolution and Literary Theory. University of Missouri.
- Carroll, Joseph. 2004. Literary Darwinism: Evolution, Human Nature, and Literature. Routledge.
- Carroll, Joseph. 2011. Reading Human Nature: Literary Darwinism in Theory and Practice. SUNY Press.
- Carroll, Joseph, Jonathan Gottschall, John Johnson, and Daniel Kruger. 2012. Graphing Jane Austen: The Evolutionary Basis of Literary Meaning. Palgrave.
- Clasen, Mathias. 2017. Why Horror Seduces. Oxford University Press.
- Coe, Kathryn. 2003. The Ancestress Hypothesis: Visual Art as Adaptation. Rutgers University Press.
- Cooke, Brett. 2002. Human Nature in Utopia: Zamyatin's We. Northwestern University Press.
- Cooke, Brett, and Frederick Turner, eds. 1999. Biopoetics: Evolutionary Explorations in the Arts. ICUS.
- Dissanayake, Ellen. 2000. Art and Intimacy: How the Arts Began. University of Washington Press.
- Dissanayake, Ellen. 1995. Homo Aestheticus. University of Washington Press.
- Dissanayake, Ellen. 1990. What Is Art For? University of Washington Press.
- Dutton, Denis. 2009. The Art Instinct: Beauty, Pleasure, and Human Evolution. Oxford University Press.
- Easterlin, Nancy. 2012. A Biocultural Approach to Literary Theory and Interpretation. Johns Hopkins University Press.
- Fromm, Harold. 2009. The Nature of Being Human: From Environmentalism to Consciousness. Johns Hopkins University Press.
- Gottschall, Jonathan. 2008. Literature, Science, and a New Humanities. Palgrave Macmillan.
- Gottschall, Jonathan. 2007. The Rape of Troy: Evolution, Violence, and the World of Homer. Cambridge.
- Gottschall, Jonathan. 2012. The Storytelling Animal: How Stories Make Us Human. Houghton Mifflin.
- Gottschall, Jonathan, and David Sloan Wilson, eds. 2005. The Literary Animal: Evolution and the Nature of Narrative. Northwestern University Press.
- Grodal, Torben. 2009. Embodied Visions: Evolution, Emotion, Culture, and Film. Oxford University Press.
- Headlam Wells, Robin. 2005. Shakespeare's Humanism. Cambridge University Press.
- Headlam Wells, Robin, and JonJoe McFadden, eds. 2006. Human Nature: Fact and Fiction. Continuum.
- Hoeg, Jerry, and Kevin S. Larsen, eds. 2009. Interdisciplinary Essays on Darwinism in Hispanic Literature and Film: The Intersection of Science and the Humanities. Mellen.
- Hood, Randall. 1979. The Genetic Function and Nature of Literature. Cal Poly, San Luis Obispo.
- Kaufman, Whitley. 2016. Human Nature and the Limits of Darwinism. Palgrave, New York.
- Love, Glen. 2003. Practical Ecocriticism: Literature, Biology, and the Environment. University of Virginia Press.
- Machann, Clinton. 2009. Masculinity in Four Victorian Epics: A Darwinist Reading. Ashgate.
- Martindale, Colin, and Paul Locher, and Vladimir M. Petrov, eds. 2007. Evolutionary and Neurocognitive Approaches to Aesthetics, Creativity, and the Arts. Baywood.
- Nordlund, Marcus. 2007. Shakespeare and the Nature of Love: Literature, Culture, Evolution. Northwestern University Press.
- Parrish, Alex C. 2013. Adaptive Rhetoric: Evolution, Culture, and the Art of Persuasion. Routledge.
- Salmon, Catherine, and Donald Symons. 2001. Warrior Lovers: Erotic Fiction, Evolution, and Female Sexuality. Weidenfeld & Nicolson.
- Saunders, Judith. 2009. Reading Edith Wharton through A Darwinian Lens: Evolutionary Biological Issues In Her Fiction. McFarland.
- Saunders, Judith. 2018. American Literary Classics: Evolutionary Perspectives. Academic Studies Press.
- Storey, Robert. 1996. Mimesis and the Human Animal: On the Biogenetic Foundations of Literary Representation. Northwestern University Press.
- Swirski, Peter. 2010. Literature, Analytically Speaking: Explorations in the Theory of Interpretation, Analytic Aesthetics, and Evolution. University of Texas Press.
- Swirski, Peter. 2007. Of Literature and Knowledge: Explorations in Narrative Thought Experiments, Evolution, and Game Theory. Routledge.
- Vermeule, Blakey. 2010. Why Do We Care about Literary Characters? Johns Hopkins University Press.

Edited collections: The volume edited by Boyd, Carroll, and Gottschall (2010) is an anthology, that is, a selection of essays and book excerpts, most of which had been previously published. Collections of essays that had not, for the most part, been previously published include those edited by Cooke and Turner (1999); Gottschall and Wilson (2005); Headlam Wells and McFadden (2006); Martindale, Locher, and Petrov (2007); Gansel and Vanderbeke;and Hoeg and Larsen (2009).

Journals: Much evolutionary literary criticism has been published in the journal Philosophy and Literature. The journal Style has also been an important venue for the Darwinists. Social science journals that have published research on the arts include Evolution and Human Behavior, Evolutionary Psychology, and Human Nature. The first issue of an annual volume The Evolutionary Review: Art, Science, Culture appeared in 2010; the journal ceased publication in 2013. The first issue of a semi-annual journal Evolutionary Studies in Imaginative Culture appeared in spring of 2017.

Symposia: A special double-issue of the journal Style (vol. 42, numbers 2/3, summer/fall 2008) was devoted to evolutionary literary theory and criticism, with a target article by Joseph Carroll ("An Evolutionary Paradigm for Literary Study"), responses by 35 scholars and scientists, and a rejoinder by Carroll. Also, a special evolutionary issue of the journal Politics and Culture contains 32 essays, including contributions to a symposium on the question "How is culture biological?", which includes six primary essays along with responses and rejoinders.

Discussion groups: Online forums for news and discussion include the Biopoetics listserv, the Facebook group for Evolutionary Narratology, and the Facebook homepage for The Evolutionary Review. Researchers with similar interests can also be located on Academia.edu by searching for people who have a research interest in Evolutionary Literary Criticism and Theory / Biopoetics or in Literary Darwinism or Evolutionary Literary Theory.
