= Joseph Carroll (scholar) =

American literary theorist

Joseph Carroll (born 1949) is a scholar in the field of literature and evolution. He received his PhD in Comparative Literature from the University of California, Berkeley, and is now Curators’ Distinguished Professor Emeritus at the University of Missouri–St. Louis.

== Publications and research ==
After monographs on Matthew Arnold (1982) and Wallace Stevens (1987), Carroll's publications have centered on situating literary study within the evolutionary human sciences. His Evolution and Literary Theory (1995) was the first book in literary theory that assimilated ideas from evolutionary psychology, evolutionary anthropology, sociobiology, human ethology, and evolutionary epistemology. He argued that evolutionary literary theory offered a viable alternative both to post-structuralism and to traditional humanism.

In the essays collected in Literary Darwinism (2004), Carroll worked toward building a comprehensive model of human nature, gave examples of evolutionary literary criticism, and criticized post-structuralism, traditional humanism, ecocriticism, cognitive poetics, and a narrow form of evolutionary psychology.

In the essays collected in Reading Human Nature (2011), Carroll examined the adaptive function of literature and the other arts, offered Darwinian interpretations of The Picture of Dorian Gray, Wuthering Heights, and Hamlet, gave examples of quantitative literary analysis, and reflected on the course of intellectual history from Charles Darwin to the present.

In the research described in Graphing Jane Austen (2012), Carroll and colleagues conducted an Internet survey of reader responses to characters in British novels of the nineteenth century. The survey used categories from a model of human nature that included basic motives, emotions, personality characteristics, and criteria for selecting mates. The focus of the study was "agonistic structure," that is, the organization of characters into protagonists, antagonists, and minor characters. A later (2017) exercise in quantitative analysis examined attitudes toward evolution among scholars in many different academic disciplines.

Carroll’s publications since Reading Human Nature (2011) include essays that are mainly theoretical, essays that are mainly exercises in interpretive literary criticism, and essays that combine theoretical exposition with interpretive criticism.

Carroll has handbook chapters in the Oxford Handbook of Evolutionary Psychology, the Handbook of Evolutionary Psychology, A Companion to Literary Theory, and Literature and Other Knowledge. He also has chapters in edited volumes on specific topics in the evolutionary human sciences: violence, sociality, death, and emotion. He produced an annotated edition of Darwin's On the Origin of Species and has coedited four volumes of essays by divers hands. He was editor-in-chief for the first 12 issues of the journal Evolutionary Studies in Imaginative Culture.

== Major works ==
- The Cultural Theory of Matthew Arnold (1982).
- Wallace Stevens’ Supreme Fiction: A New Romanticism (1987).
- Evolution and Literary Theory (1995).
- On the Origin of Species By Means of Natural Selection, by Charles Darwin, edited by Joseph Carroll (2003).
- Literary Darwinism: Evolution, Human Nature, and Literature (2004).
- Evolution, Literature and Film: A Reader (2010), edited by Joseph Carroll, Brian Boyd, and Jonathan Gottschall.
- Reading Human Nature: Literary Darwinism in Theory and Practice (2011).
- Graphing Jane Austen: The Evolutionary Basis of Literary Meaning (2012), by Joseph Carroll, Jonathan Gottschall, John A. Johnson, and Daniel J. Kruger.
- Darwin's Bridge: Uniting the Humanities and Sciences (2016), edited by Joseph Carroll, Dan P. McAdams, and Edward O. Wilson.
- Evolutionary Perspectives on Imaginative Culture (2020), edited by Joseph Carroll, Mathias Clasen, and Emelie Jonsson.
- Imaginative Culture and Human Nature: Evolutionary Perspectives on the Arts, Religion, and Ideology (2022), edited by Joseph Carroll, John Johnson, Emelie Jonsson, Rex Jung, and Valerie van Mulukom.
