= Universal Darwinism =

Application of Darwinian theory to other fields

Universal Darwinism (Note: Also known as generalized Darwinism, universal selection theory, and Darwinian metaphysics.) is a variety of approaches that extend the theory of Darwinism beyond its original domain of biological evolution on Earth. Universal Darwinism aims to formulate a generalized version of the mechanisms of variation, selection and heredity proposed by Charles Darwin, so that they can apply to explain evolution in a wide variety of other domains, including psychology, linguistics, economics, culture, medicine, computer science, and physics.

Examples of patterns that have been postulated to undergo variation and selection, and thus adaptation, are genes, ideas (memes), theories, technologies, neurons and their connections, words, computer programs, firms, antibodies, institutions, law and judicial systems, quantum states and even whole universes.

== History and development ==
Conceptually, "evolutionary theorizing about cultural, social, and economic phenomena" preceded Darwin, but was still lacking the concept of natural selection.

Starting in the 1950s, Donald T. Campbell was one of the first and most influential authors to revive the tradition, and to formulate a generalized Darwinian algorithm directly applicable to phenomena outside of biology. In this, he was inspired by William Ross Ashby's view of self-organization and intelligence as fundamental processes of selection. His aim was to explain the development of science and other forms of knowledge by focusing on the variation and selection of ideas and theories, thus laying the basis for the domain of evolutionary epistemology. In the 1990s, Campbell's formulation of the mechanism of "blind-variation-and-selective-retention" (BVSR) was further developed and extended to other domains under the labels of "universal selection theory" or "universal selectionism" by his disciples Gary Cziko, Mark Bickhard, and Francis Heylighen.

Richard Dawkins may have first coined the term "universal Darwinism" in 1983 to describe his conjecture that any possible life forms existing outside the Solar System would evolve by natural selection just as they do on Earth. This conjecture was also presented in 1983 in a paper entitled “The Darwinian Dynamic” that dealt with the evolution of order in living systems and certain nonliving physical systems. It was suggested “that ‘life’, wherever it might exist in the universe, evolves according to the same dynamical law” termed the Darwinian dynamic. Henry Plotkin in his 1997 book on Darwin machines makes the link between universal Darwinism and Campbell's evolutionary epistemology.

The philosopher of mind Daniel Dennett, in his 1995 book Darwin's Dangerous Idea, developed the idea of a Darwinian process, involving variation, selection and retention, as a generic algorithm that is substrate-neutral and could be applied to many fields of knowledge outside of biology. He described the idea of natural selection as a "universal acid" that cannot be contained in any vessel, as it seeps through the walls and spreads ever further, touching and transforming ever more domains. He notes in particular the field of memetics in the social sciences.

In agreement with Dennett's prediction, over the past decades the Darwinian perspective has spread ever more widely, in particular across the social sciences as the foundation for numerous schools of study including memetics, evolutionary economics, evolutionary psychology, evolutionary anthropology, neural Darwinism, and evolutionary linguistics. Researchers have postulated Darwinian processes as operating at the foundations of physics, cosmology and chemistry via the theories of quantum Darwinism, observation selection effects and cosmological natural selection.

Author D. B. Kelley has formulated one of the most all-encompassing approaches to universal Darwinism. In his 2013 book The Origin of Everything, he holds that natural selection involves not the preservation of favored races in the struggle for life, as shown by Darwin, but the preservation of favored systems in contention for existence. The fundamental mechanism behind all such stability and evolution is therefore what Kelley calls "survival of the fittest systems." Because all systems are cyclical, the Darwinian processes of iteration, variation and selection are operative not only among species but among all natural phenomena both large-scale and small. Kelley thus maintains that, since the Big Bang especially, the universe has evolved from a highly chaotic state to one that is now highly ordered with many stable phenomena, naturally selected.

=== Gene-based Darwinian extensions ===
- Evolutionary psychology assumes that our emotions, preferences and cognitive mechanisms are the product of natural selection
  - Evolutionary educational psychology applies evolutionary psychology to education
  - Evolutionary developmental psychology applies evolutionary psychology to cognitive development
  - Darwinian Happiness applies evolutionary psychology to understand the optimal conditions for human well-being
  - Darwinian literary studies tries to understand the characters and plots of narrative on the basis of evolutionary psychology
  - Evolutionary aesthetics applies evolutionary psychology to explain our sense of beauty, especially for landscapes and human bodies
  - Evolutionary musicology applies evolutionary aesthetics to music
- Evolutionary anthropology studies the evolution of human beings
- Sociobiology proposes that social systems in animals and humans are the product of Darwinian biological evolution
- Human behavioral ecology investigates how human behavior has become adapted to its environment via variation and selection
- Evolutionary medicine investigates the origin of diseases by looking at the evolution both of the human body and of its parasites
- Paleolithic diet proposes that the most healthy nutrition is the one to which our hunter-gatherer ancestors have adapted over millions of years
- Paleolithic lifestyle generalizes the Paleolithic diet to include exercise, behavior and exposure to the environment
- Molecular evolution studies evolution at the level of DNA, RNA and proteins
- Biosocial criminology studies crime using several different approaches that include genetics and evolutionary psychology
- Evolutionary linguistics studies the evolution of language, biologically as well as culturally

=== Other Darwinian extensions ===
- Quantum Darwinism sees the emergence of classical states in physics as a natural selection of the most stable quantum properties
- Cosmological natural selection hypothesizes that universes reproduce and are selected for having fundamental constants that maximize "fitness"
- Complex adaptive systems models the dynamics of complex systems in part on the basis of the variation and selection of its components
- Evolutionary archaeology is a Darwinian approach to the cultural evolution of tools
- Evolutionary computation is a Darwinian approach to the generation of adapted computer programs
- Genetic algorithms, a subset of evolutionary computation, models variation by "genetic" operators (mutation and recombination)
- Evolutionary robotics applies Darwinian algorithms to the design of autonomous robots
- Artificial life uses Darwinian algorithms to let organism-like computer agents evolve in a software simulation
- Evolutionary art uses variation and selection to produce works of art
- Evolutionary music does the same for works of music
- Clonal selection theory sees the creation of adapted antibodies in the immune system as a process of variation and selection
- Neural Darwinism proposes that neurons and their synapses are selectively pruned during brain development
- Evolutionary epistemology of theories assumes that scientific theories develop through variation and selection
- Memetics is a theory of the variation, transmission, and selection of cultural items, such as ideas, fashions, and traditions
- Dual inheritance theory a framework for cultural evolution developed largely independently of memetics
- Cultural selection theory is a theory of cultural evolution related to memetics
- Cultural materialism is an anthropological approach that contends that the physical world impacts and sets constraints on human behavior.
- Environmental determinism is a social science theory that proposes that it is the environment that ultimately determines human culture.
- Evolutionary economics studies the variation and selection of economic phenomena, such as commodities, technologies, institutions and organizations.
- Evolutionary ethics investigates the origin of morality, and uses Darwinian foundations to formulate ethical values
- Big History is the science-based narrative integrating the history of the universe, earth, life, and humanity. Scholars consider Universal Darwinism to be a possible unifying theme for the discipline.

== Ancient philosophy and cosmology ==
Some philosophers produced conceptions opposed to the dominant teleological and essentialist thesis (Plato) and resembling Darwin's but applied to every being and not only living ones. Therefore, they can be considered as ontological, cosmological, general and universal darwinisms. Darwin was aware of it : in On the Origin of Species, he cites Empedocles (cited by Aristotle).

- Empedocles

History of evolutionary thought#Antiquity:~:text=Empedocles argued that,[12]

Atomists :

- Epicurus

- Lucretius in De rerum natura, II, 1048; V, 837–877

- David Hume in Dialogues Concerning Natural Religion, VIII, referring to Epicurus

- Gottfried Wilhelm Leibniz, Théodicée, I, VII : the existing world is the best of the possible worlds.

== Books ==
- Campbell, John. Universal Darwinism: the path of knowledge.
- Cziko, Gary. Without Miracles: Universal Selection Theory and the Second Darwinian Revolution.
- Hodgson, Geoffrey Martin; Knudsen, Thorbjorn. Darwin's Conjecture: The Search for General Principles of Social and Economic Evolution.
- Kelley, D. B. The Origin of Everything via Universal Selection, or the Preservation of Favored Systems in Contention for Existence.
- Plotkin, Henry. Evolutionary Worlds without End.
- Plotkin, Henry. Darwin Machines and the Nature of Knowledge.
- Dennett, Daniel. Darwin's Dangerous Idea.

== See also ==
- Memetics – Study of self-replicating units of culture
- History of evolutionary thought
