= Rupert Riedl =

Austrian zoologist

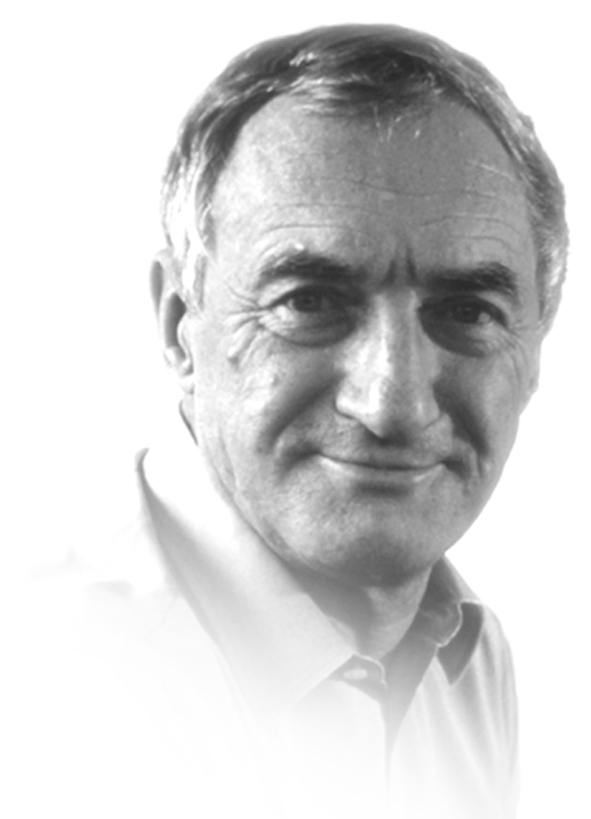
- Rupert Riedl
- Born: 22 February 1925
- Died: 18 September 2005 (aged 80)
- Children: Sabina Riedl, Barbara Schweder

Rupert Riedl (22 February 1925 – † 18 September 2005) was an Austrian zoologist. He contributed to the areas of marine biology, developmental biology, morphology, evolution (a systems approach) and evolutionary epistemology.

== Biography ==
Riedl was a professor at the University of Vienna between 1971 and 1995, where he established the first research unit of marine biology in Austria and the first electron microscopy laboratory at the university. He is credited with the creation of marine biology, theoretical biology, and cognitive biology at the University of Vienna. In his later life, he was active as a public intellectual and environmental activist. He was the Founder President of the Club of Vienna.

== Marine Biology ==
Riedl is well-known for his work in the field of marine biology (biology of sea caves, fauna and flora of the Mediterranean). He undertook several research trips and assembled field guides of the Adriatic Sea and the Mediterranean. His expeditions included:

- 1948–1949 Head of the first Austrian post-war expedition with Heinz Löffler in Sicily and in the North African island world
- 1950–1952 Study stays at various sea stations in the Mediterranean and on the North Sea
- 1952 Head of the Austrian “Tyrrhenia Expedition”

== Theoretical Biology ==
Riedl founded and headed the Unit in Theoretical Biology at the Institute of Zoology.

He held the opinion that the modern synthesis of the mid-20th century had ignored the role of development and morphology in evolution. He argued that the modern synthesis had failed to explain the origin of body plans and patterns at the macroevolutionary level. He presented his evolutionary theory in Order in Living Organisms: A Systems Analysis of Evolution (translated, 1978). He called for an extended evolutionary synthesis to integrate processes from developmental biology and macroevolutionary perspectives. Riedl and Michael Conrad in the 1970s were the first two scientists to propose explicit mechanisms for the evolution of evolvability.

== Cognitive Biology ==
Riedl was a scientist with broad interests, whose influence in epistemology grounded in evolutionary theory was notable, although less in English-speaking circles than in German or even Spanish speaking ones. His 1984 work, Biology of Knowledge: The evolutionary basis of reason examined cognitive abilities and the increasing complexity of biological diversification over the immense periods of evolutionary time.

Riedl built upon the work of the Viennese school of thought initially typified by Konrad Lorenz, and continued in Vienna by Gerhard Vollmer, Franz Wuketits, and in Spain by Nicanor Ursura. Riedl was skeptical of German idealism, and nourished by the tradition that produced the scientists and philosophers of science Ernst Mach, Ludwig Boltzmann, Erwin Schrödinger, Karl Popper, Hans Reichenbach and Sigmund Freud.

Lorenz believed that the Kantian framework of cognitive concepts such as three-dimensional space and time were not fixed but built up over phylogenetic history, potentially subject to further developments. Lorenz's position, as expanded by Riedl, attempted to make it easier to assimilate non-common sense areas of physics such as quantum field theory and string theory.

Riedl drew clear distinctions between the deductive and inductive (non conscious) cognitive processes characteristic of the left and right cerebral hemispheres. His analysis of what he called "the pitfalls of reason" deserves special attention. He, like Lorenz, was concerned with cognitive processes that might endanger the future of civilization.

Riedl had less direct influence on academic philosophy than his profound influence on the thinking of investigators in neuroscience such as Michael Gazzaniga, Antonio Damasio, and Vilayanur S. Ramachandran, whose investigations combine synergistically with those of more physiologically oriented scientists such as Eric Kandel and Rodolfo Llinás, as well as computational models that take advantage of the techniques of systems dynamics as practiced by the physiologists Denis Noble and P. Read Montague.

== Education and teaching ==
- 1945: Riedl started studies in fine arts, medicine, anthropology but at the end he obtained a degree in biology with specialization in zoology at the University of Vienna in 1951.
- 1956: assistant professor, University of Vienna
- 1960: State doctorate and professor at the University of Vienna
- 1967 guest professor at the University of North Carolina in Chapel Hill
- from 1968: full professor and research professor of Marine Sciences at the University of North Carolina
- From 1971: head of the Institute of Zoology and temporary head of the Institute of Human Biology, both at the University of Vienna, and visiting professor at the University of North Carolina
- 1983-1990: head of the Institute of Zoology and Anthropology at the University of Vienna

== Works ==
- Riedl, R. (1978) Order in Living Organisms: A Systems Analysis of Evolution. New York: Wiley.
- Riedl, R. (1983) (ed.) Flora und Fauna des Mittelmeeres. Hamburg: P. Parey.
- Riedl, R. (1984) Biology of Knowledge: The Evolutionary Basis of Reason. Chichester: John Wiley & Sons.
