= Mathias Clasen =

Literary scholar

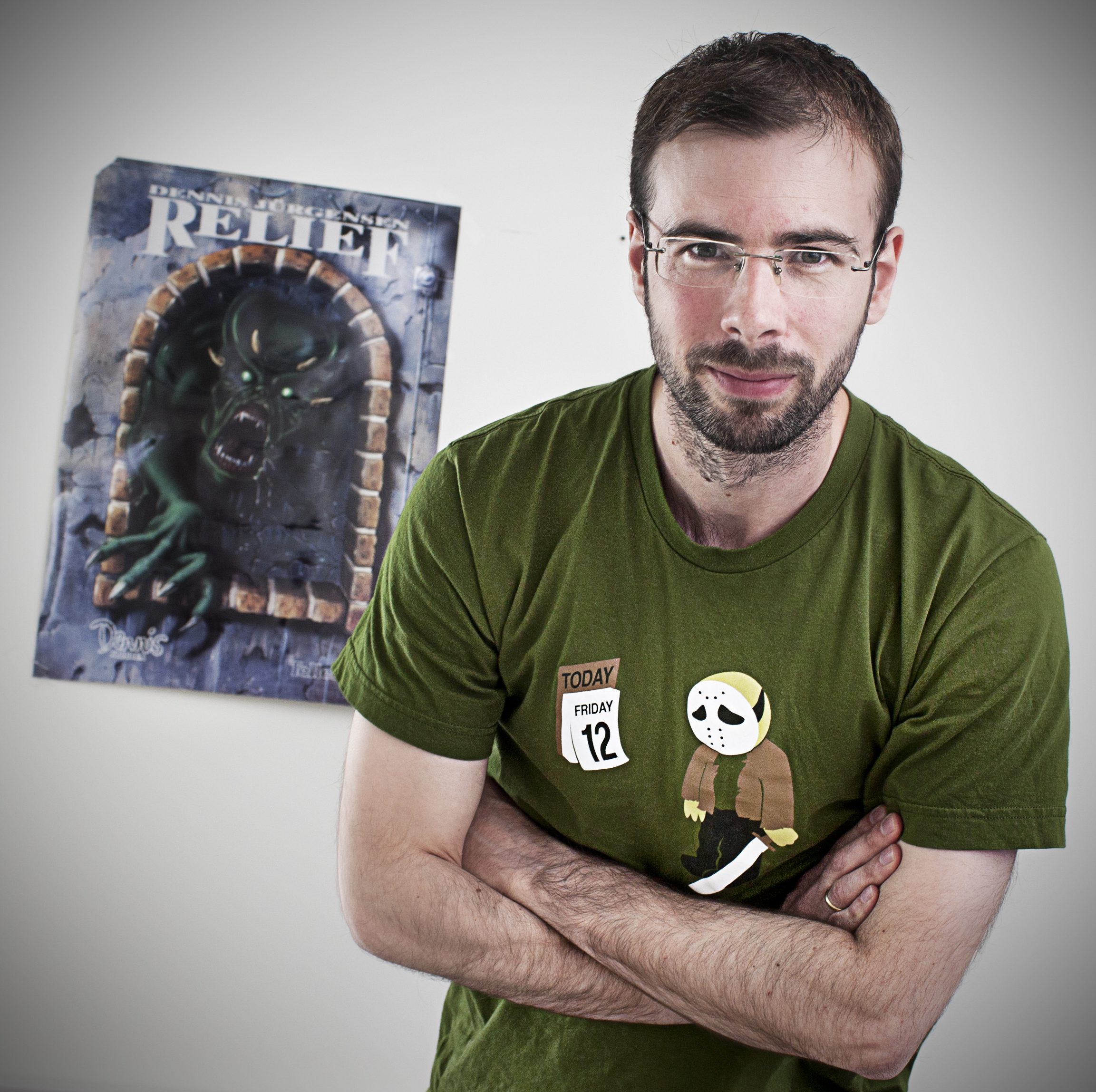
- Publicity photo of Mathias Clasen (2012)
- Born: 1978 (age 47–48)
- Scientific career
- Fields: Horror studies, biocultural theory, recreational fear
- Institutions: Aarhus University
- Website: au.dk/en/mc@cc

Mathias Clasen (born 1978) is a Danish scholar of horror fiction and recreational fear and the author/editor of several non-fiction books on the horror genre as well as two horror anthologies. He is an associate professor in literature and media at Aarhus University, his alma mater, from where he received his PhD in 2012. He is also director of the Recreational Fear Lab at Aarhus University, a research unit dedicated to the scientific study of recreational fear and horror.

Clasen’s research integrates horror study with the natural and social sciences, in particular human behavioral biology and evolutionary and cognitive psychology. His academic work builds on the evolutionary, or biocultural, approach of literary scholars such as Joseph Carroll, Brian Boyd, and Jonathan Gottschall. His more recent work has applied empirical and quantitative methods to the study of recreational fear and horror.

Clasen's book Why Horror Seduces was published on October 31, 2017 by Oxford University Press. The book is about the appeal and functions of horror, with a focus on modern American horror film and literature. His latest book, A Very Nervous Person's Guide to Horror Movies, also published by Oxford University Press (2021), addresses common concerns about horror movies with the aid of psychological research and is directed at a general audience.

== Major works ==
- Drager, damer & dæmoner (2002).
- Homo Timidus (2004).
- Horror.dk (2008) – editor.
- Velkommen til dybet (2011) – editor.
- Monsters and Horror Stories: A Biocultural Approach (2012) - PhD dissertation.
- Monstre (2012).
- Why Horror Seduces (2017).
- Evolutionary Perspectives on Imaginative Culture (2020) - co-editor.
- A Very Nervous Person's Guide to Horror Movies (2022).
