= Everett Kelly =

Everett Kelly or Everett Kelley may refer to:

- Everett Kelly (politician) (1926–2018), American politician from Florida
- Everett E. Kelley (1898–1983), American football player
- Everett Kelley (unionist), American labor union leader
- E. Lowell Kelly (1905–1986), American clinical psychologist and professor of psychology
