= Cultural selection theory =

Study of cultural change modelled on theories of evolutionary biology

Cultural selection theory is the study of cultural change modelled on theories of evolutionary biology. Cultural selection theory has so far never been a separate discipline. However it has been proposed that human culture exhibits key Darwinian evolutionary properties, and "the structure of a science of cultural evolution should share fundamental features with the structure of the science of biological evolution". In addition to Darwin's work the term historically covers a diverse range of theories from both the sciences and the humanities including those of Lamark, politics and economics e.g. Bagehot, anthropology e.g. Edward B. Tylor, literature e.g. Ferdinand Brunetière, evolutionary ethics e.g. Leslie Stephen, sociology e.g. Albert Keller, anthropology e.g. Bronislaw Malinowski, Biosciences e.g. Alex Mesoudi, geography e.g. Richard Ormrod, sociobiology and biodiversity e.g. E. O. Wilson, computer programming e.g. Richard Brodie, and other fields e.g. neoevolutionism and evolutionary archaeology.

== Outline ==
Crozier suggests that Cultural Selection emerges from three bases: Social contagion theory, Evolutionary epistemology, and Memetics.

This theory is an extension of memetics. In memetics, memes, much like biology's genes, are informational units passed through generations of culture. However, unlike memetics, cultural selection theory moves past these isolated "memes" to encompass selection processes, including continuous and quantitative parameters. Two other approaches to cultural selection theory are social contagion and evolutionary epistemology. Social contagion theory’s epidemiological approach construes social entities as analogous to parasites that are transmitted virally through a population of biological organisms. Evolutionary epistemology's focus lies in causally connecting evolutionary biology and rationality by generating explanations for why traits for rational behaviour or thought patterns would have been selected for in a species’ evolutionary history. Memetics models cultural change after population genetics, taking cultural units to be analogous to genes.

== Criticism ==
The cultural selection theory faces many objections due to the lack of evidence to support the adaptation of natural selection in the structural mechanisms of cultural systems. Major objections against the cultural selection theory stem from Lamarckianism, genotype-phenotype distinction, common hereditary architecture, biological analogue for cultural units, and environmental interactions. The Biological Analogue for Cultural Units breaks down into 3 subunits. The first is regarding strict analogues. This means that a biological unit (traits etc.) should be related to a cultural unit. This is a way for the old biological model and the modern cultural model to correlate and solidify the point. The second is regarding trait analogues. This means that some analogues are viewed the wrong way. Sometimes, one analogue is mistaken for another and often, the line between the two analogues is unclear and the distinction isn't as evident. The third is regarding virus analogue. This clarifies the point that the ability of the virus is different from the organism and the ability of both the virus and organisms should be looked at independently.

Some have argued that in order for the cultural selection theory to stand strong against objections, conclusive and explicit case studies are required. There needs to be empirical support to clarify the interaction between cultural systems and their environments. Crozier conducted a study on the acoustic adaptation of bird songs. This research study provided empirical evidence to support and strengthen the cultural selection theory.

== See also ==
- Biocultural evolution – Theory of human behavior
- Dual inheritance theory – Theory of human behavior
- Evolutionary economics – Subject inspired by evolutionary biology
- Evolutionary epistemology – Ambiguous term applied to several concepts
- Evolutionary psychology – Branch of psychology
- Leitkultur – Concept in German conservatism
- Meme – Cultural idea that spreads through imitation
- Multiple discovery – Hypothesis about scientific discoveries and inventions
- Behavioral contagion, also known as Social contagion – Spontaneous, unsolicited and uncritical imitation of another's behavior
- Sociocultural evolution – Evolution of societies
- Universal Darwinism – Application of Darwinian theory to other fields
