= David Fishelov =

Israeli professor

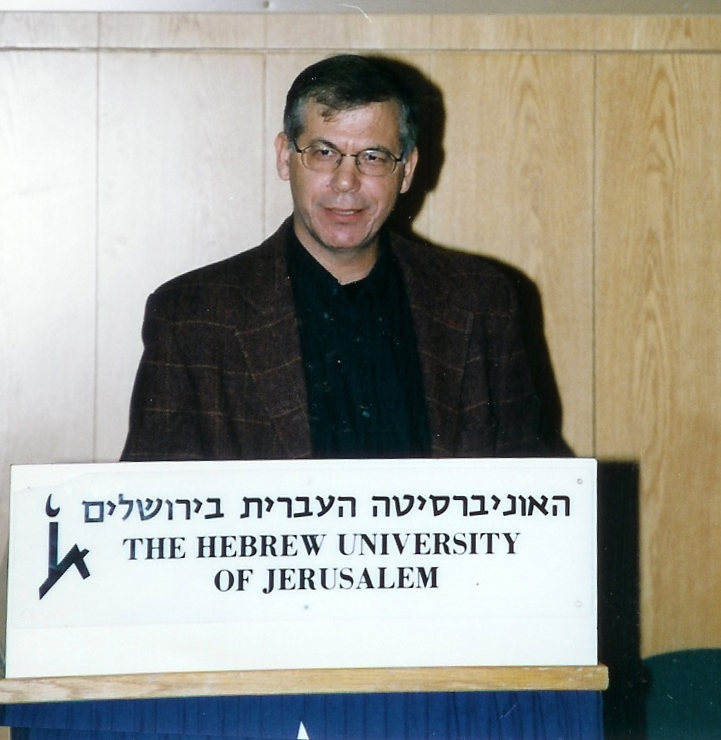
David Fishelov in 2011.

David Fishelov (Hebrew: דוד פישלוב), born June 1, 1954, is an Israeli professor emeritus of comparative literature at the Hebrew University of Jerusalem.

== Education ==
Fishelov earned his bachelor's degree in comparative literature and philosophy (1979), his master's degree in comparative literature from Tel Aviv University (1982), and a doctorate in comparative literature from the University of California, Berkeley (1986). He wrote his doctoral thesis on the role of metaphors in theories of literary genres.

== Career ==
Fishelov has taught in the Department of Comparative Literature at the Hebrew University of Jerusalem since 1986. He has worked as a visiting professor at Berkeley, the University of Chicago, Columbia University, and the School for Advanced Studies in the Social Sciences in Paris, and also taught at the Rothberg International School of the Hebrew University of Jerusalem. He is a member of the editorial board of Connotations: A Journal for Critical Debate.

In 2011, Fishelov served as chairman of the committee appointed by the Israeli Ministry of Culture and the city of Jerusalem to award the Yehuda Amichai Prize in poetry.

As a literary critic, Fishelov has published review articles and essays in the literary supplements of the daily newspapers Davar, Haaretz, and Yediot Ahronot. He has also written afterwords to Hebrew translations of 18th-century literary works, such as Daniel Defoe's Robinson Crusoe and Moll Flanders, Jonathan Swift's Selected Writing, and Laurence Sterne's A Sentimental Journey Through France and Italy.

== Research ==
Fishelov's topics of research include genre theory, poetic simile, biblical characters in modern literature, the role of literary and artistic dialogues in canon formation, 18th-century English literature, and modern Hebrew poetry.

His book Metaphors of Genre made a significant impact on the field of genre studies. In it, Fishelov described the role played by conceptual metaphors in modern theories of literary genre: Literary genres have been compared to biological species, to families, to social institutions, and to speech acts. Unlike post-structuralist and deconstructionist criticism, the book argues that generic categories still play an important role in the process of the production, reception, and interpretation of literary texts. When the book first came out, some reviewers criticized it for advocating a conservative approach to genres, but since then, the book's usefulness in genre studies has been acknowledged by many scholars in the field.

In Like a Rainfall, Fishelov offered a model for describing poetic similes (e.g., T. S. Eliot's "the evening is spread out against the sky / Like a patient etherized upon a table") as a cluster of functional deviations from the norms of trite, nonpoetic similes (e.g., "it is as good as gold"). Alongside the general model, the book offered close readings of poetic similes drawn from poets of different periods and languages (e.g., Virgil, John Donne, Charles Baudelaire, and Yehuda Amichai).

In his book Samson's Locks (in Hebrew), which won the first Bahat Prize for nonfiction, Fishelov traced adaptations of the biblical story of Samson throughout history and demonstrated the role of the Bible as a source of inspiration for authors and artists.

Fishelov wrote about the transformations of mythical and classical stories in Dialogues with/and Great Books, in which he argued, through a blend of empirical methods and close readings, that literary and artistic adaptations foster and maintain a book's canonical status.

In a 2017 article, Fishelov argued that the attempt to link Darwinism to literary studies has failed "to produce compelling evidence to support some of its basic assumptions (notably that literature is an adaptation)" and called on literary scholars to be more conceptually rigorous when "pursuing empirical research into different aspects of literary evolution."

== Selected articles ==
- Types of Characters, Characteristics of Types
- Genre Theory and Family Resemblance – Revisited
- Yehuda Amichai: A Modernist Metaphysical Poet
- Poetic and Non Poetic Simile: Structure, Semantics, Rhetoric
- The Structure of Generic Categories: Some Cognitive Aspects
- The Birth of a Genre
- Robinson Crusoe, 'The Other' and the Poetics of Surprise
- Shall I Compare Thee? Simile Understanding and Semantic Categories
- Dialogues with/and Great Books, With Some Serious Reflections on Robinson Crusoe
- Roads-Not-Taken, Taken by the Adapter: The Case of Biblical Samson
- Types of Dialogue: Echo, Deaf and Dialectical
- Poetry and Poeticity in James Joyce’s The Dead, Baudelaire’s Le Spleen de Paris and Yehuda Amichai
- The Poetics of Six-Word Stories
