= Henry Plotkin =

British psychologist (1940–2021)

- Born: 11 December 1940; Johannesburg, South Africa
- Died: 15 December 2021 (aged 81)
- Education: University of the Witwatersrand
- Scientific career
- Fields: Evolutionary theory, evolutionary epistemology, cultural evolution, evolutionary psychology
- Workplaces: University College London
- Doctoral students: Kevin Lala, Cecilia Heyes

Henry Charles Plotkin (11 December 1940 – 15 December 2021) was a British evolutionary psychologist who applied Darwinian principles to the understanding of the mind, behavior, culture and knowledge.

== Early life and education ==
Born in Johannesburg, South Africa, Plotkin completed his undergraduate studies at the University of the Witwatersrand. In 1964, he relocated to the United Kingdom and earned a doctorate in physiological psychology from University College London in 1968.

== Academic career ==
From 1965 to 1972, Plotkin worked as a research scientist at the Medical Research Council. He spent two years (1970–1972) as a postdoctoral fellow at Stanford University. Upon returning to the UK, he joined University College London as a lecturer. He was promoted to Reader in 1988 and became a professor in 1993. He was head of the Psychology Department at UCL from 1993 to 1998 and was named Emeritus Professor in 2005.

His doctoral students include Kevin Lala and Cecilia Heyes.

== Contributions ==
- Evolutionary Psychology: Plotkin's work helped establish the field of evolutionary psychology with accessible overviews like "Evolution in Mind" that explained how natural selection shaped the human mind. Plotkin applied evolutionary principles to psychological topics like learning, intelligence, and memory.
- Cultural Evolution: Plotkin wrote extensively on evolution and culture. In "The Imagined World Made Real," Plotkin brought an evolutionary approach to analyzing culture, arguing it evolves through Darwinian mechanisms. This helped start the study of cultural evolution and gene-culture coevolution as scientific disciplines.
- Behavior's Role in Evolution: Plotkin's book "The Role of Behavior in Evolution" underscored how behavior is not just an evolutionary outcome, but a key driver shaping trajectories. This work influenced later research emphasizing animal agency in evolution through niche construction.
- Evolutionary Epistemology: Plotkin pioneered the field of evolutionary epistemology, which analyzes the growth of knowledge from a Darwinian perspective. In his "Darwin Machines and the Nature of Knowledge", he proposed modeling the mind as a Darwin machine that accumulates knowledge via evolutionary processes of variation, selection, and retention.

== Bibliography ==
=== Books ===
- Learning, Development and Culture: Essays in Evolutionary Epistemology (1982). Wiley–Blackwell. ISBN 978-0-471-10219-9
- Darwin Machines and the Nature of Knowledge (1994). Cambridge, MA: Harvard University Press. ISBN 0-674-19280-X
- Evolution in Mind: An Introduction to Evolutionary Psychology (1998). Harvard University Press. ISBN 978-0-674-27120-3
- The Imagined World Made Real: Towards a Natural Science of Culture (2002). Allen Lane. ISBN 978-0-7139-9408-7
- The Role of Behavior in Evolution, ed. (2008). The MIT Press. ISBN 978-0-262-51222-0
- Evolutionary Worlds without End. (2010). Oxford University Press. ISBN 978-0-19-954495-0

=== Articles ===
- Pribram, K. H.; Plotkin, H. C.; Anderson, R. M.; Leong, D. (1977). "Information sources in the delayed alternation task for normal and 'frontal' monkeys". Neuropsychologia. 15 (2): 329–340.
- Plotkin, Henry C.; Odling-Smee, F. J. (1979). "Learning, change, and evolution: an enquiry into the teleonomy of learning". In Advances in the Study of Behavior. 10: 1–41. Academic Press.
- Plotkin, H.C.; Odling-Smee, F.J. (1979). "Learning, Change, and Evolution: An Enquiry into the Teleonomy of Learning". Advances in the Study of Behavior. 10: 1–41. doi:10.1016/S0065-3454(08)60092-3
- Plotkin, H. C.; Odling-Smee, F. J. (1981). "A multiple-level model of evolution and its implications for sociobiology". Behavioral and Brain Sciences. 4 (2): 225–235. doi:10.1017/S0140525X00008566
- Heyes, Celia M.; Plotkin, Henry C. (1989). "Replicators and interactors in cultural evolution". In What the philosophy of biology is: Essays dedicated to David Hull. Dordrecht: Springer Netherlands. pp. 139–162.
- Plotkin, H.C. (1987). "Evolutionary epistemology as science". Biol Philos. 2: 295–313. doi:10.1007/BF00128835
- Plotkin, H.C. (1995). "Non-genetic transmission of information: Candidate cognitive processes and the evolution of culture". Behavioural Processes. 35 (1–3): 207–213. doi:10.1016/0376-6357(95)00056-9
- Plotkin, Henry (2011). "Human nature, cultural diversity and evolutionary theory". Phil. Trans. R. Soc. B. 366: 454–463. doi:10.1098/rstb.2010.0160
- Plotkin, Henry (2012). "The power of culture". In Barrett, Louise; Dunbar, Robin (eds.). Oxford Handbook of Evolutionary Psychology. pp. 11–20. doi:10.1093/oxfordhb/9780198568308.013.0002 ISBN 978-0-19-856830-8
