= Kevin Lala =

English evolutionary biologist

- Born: Kevin Neville Lala; 5 October 1962 (age 63)
- Other name: Kevin Laland
- Education: University College London (Ph.D., 1990)
- Alma mater: University of Southampton
- Known for: Niche construction theory
- Awards: Royal Society Wolfson Research Merit Award
- Scientific career
- Fields: Behavioral biology Evolutionary biology
- Workplaces: University of St Andrews
- Thesis: Social transmission in Norway rats and its implications for evolutionary theory (1990)
- Doctoral advisor: Henry Plotkin

Kevin Neville Lala (formerly Laland; born 5 October 1962) is an English evolutionary biologist who is Professor of Behavioural and Evolutionary Biology at the University of St Andrews in Scotland. Educated at the University of Southampton and University College London, he was a Human Frontier Science Program fellow at the University of California, Berkeley before joining the University of St Andrews in 2002. He is one of the co-founders of niche construction theory and a prominent advocate of the extended evolutionary synthesis. He is a fellow of the Royal Society of Edinburgh and the Society of Biology. He has also received a European Research Council Advanced Grant, a Royal Society Wolfson Research Merit Award, and a John Templeton Foundation grant. He was the president of the European Human Behaviour and Evolution Association from 2007 to 2010 and a former president of the Cultural Evolution Society. Lala is currently an external faculty of the Konrad Lorenz Institute for Evolution and Cognition Research and Editor-in-Chief of Biological Theory.

== Cognition and learning ==
The Lala Lab is primarily focused on animal social learning, innovation, and intelligence, as well as human evolution, particularly the evolution of cognition and culture. Their work lies at the interdisciplinary interface of evolutionary biology, animal behavior, ecology, and psychology.

== Niche construction theory ==
Following John Odling-Smee's attempt in 1988 to formalize the process of niche construction as an evolutionary process, Odling-Smee, Lala, and Marcus W. Feldman developed a theoretical framework – Niche Construction Theory – that models niche construction as an evolutionary process reciprocally interacting with the process of natural selection. This theory has been applied widely across multiple fields, including ecology evolutionary developmental biology, and human and cultural evolution.

== Extended evolutionary synthesis ==
In the mid-2010s, Kevin Lala, Tobias Uller, and colleagues pushed for an extended evolutionary synthesis in a series of high-impact articles. From 2015 to 2018, Uller and Lala led a large international John Templeton Foundation grant to test key hypotheses and assumptions of the extended evolutionary synthesis.

== Anti-racism work ==
Kevin Lala previously served on the Equality, Diversity and Inclusion division of the School of Biology as deputy director. He is currently serving as an anti-racism advocate.

Lala changed his name from Laland, stating on his lab website "Lala was my original family name, which my parents anglicized when I was 4, in an attempt to reduce the racism that their children experienced. I may have benefited from my surname being anglicized, but it did not sit right with me that I should still bear that name more than 50 years later. I wish to celebrate my ancestry not hide it. I am proud of my Parsi Indian heritage. I am not going to be intimidated by racists."

== Publications ==
=== Journal articles ===
- Google scholar

=== Books ===
- Evolutionary Causation: Biological and Philosophical Reflections, The MIT Press, 2019, Tobias Uller, Kevin N Laland ISBN 9780262039925
- Darwin's Unfinished Symphony: How Culture Made the Human Mind, Princeton University Press, 2017 ISBN 9780691151182
- Social Learning: An Introduction to Mechanisms, Methods, and Models, Princeton University Press, 2013, William Hoppitt and Kevin N. Laland ISBN 9780691150703
- Sense and nonsense: Evolutionary perspectives on human behaviour, Oxford University Press, 2011, Kevin N. Laland and Gillian R. Brown, 2nd edition ISBN 9780199586967
- Niche Construction: The Neglected Process in Evolution, Princeton University Press, 2003, John Odling-Smee, Kevin N. Laland, Marcus W. Feldman ISBN 9780691044378
- Sense and nonsense: Evolutionary perspectives on human behaviour, Oxford University Press, 2002, Kevin N. Laland and Gillian R. Brown, 1st edition ISBN 9780198508847
- Sense and nonsense: Evolutionary perspectives on human behaviour, Oxford University Press, 2024, Kevin N. Lala and Gillian R. Brown, 3rd edition ISBN 9780198908203
