= Donald W. Fiske =

American psychologist (1916–2003)

- Born: August 27, 1916; Lincoln, Nebraska, U.S.
- Died: April 6, 2003 (aged 86); Chicago, Illinois, U.S.
- Education: Harvard University (BA); University of Michigan (PhD)
- Spouse: Barbara Page
- Children: Alan; Susan
- Scientific career
- Fields: Psychology
- Doctoral advisor: E. Lowell Kelly

Donald Winslow Fiske (August 27, 1916 – April 6, 2003) was an American psychologist.

== Early life and education ==
Fiske was born in Lincoln, Nebraska. He grew up in Medford, Massachusetts. He graduated from Harvard University and, in 1948, earned a PhD from the University of Michigan.

== Career ==
Fiske was a professor of psychology at the University of Chicago.

Fiske specialized in methodological issues in personality, ability, and trait research. He was, with Donald T. Campbell, co-author of a seminal paper regarding the multitrait-multimethod approach to evaluating construct validity.

== Personal life and death ==
Fiske had a wife, Barbara Page, a son, Alan Fiske (who became a professor of anthropology at the University of California, Los Angeles), and a daughter, Susan Fiske (who became a professor of Psychology and Public Affairs at Princeton University). He resided in Hyde Park, Chicago, where he died on April 6, 2003.
