= Club of Vienna =

International association

The Club of Vienna is an international association which has 24 members and interested in social, scientific, economic and ecological issues.

== Areas of focus ==
Particular attention is given to:

- intellectual, cultural, ecological and economic potential in the area of conflict between regional and national interests
- the trend towards globalization
- possible scenarios for the city of Vienna.

== Founding president ==
- Rupert Riedl (1925-2005)

== Current topics of the Club of Vienna ==
- Consequences of migration in Europe: opening of the east, transit, currents of traffic, economic consequences, social issues, culture; advantages and disadvantages
- Participatory decision-making in democracy
- Acceleration phenomena
- Non-material indicators of prosperity
- The new capitalism
- Europe in the 21st century – two differing speeds?
- Slaves and masters in information society
- Sustainability as an investment principle
- Examine "The Reasons of Growth"

== Literature ==
- Kapitalismus gezähmt? Weltreligionen und Kapitalismus (H. Knoflacher, K. Woltron, A. Rosik-Kölbl, editors), 2006. Verlag echo media, Vienna
- Wege in den Postkapitalismus (K. Woltron, H. Knoflacher, A. Rosik-Kölbl, editors), 2004. Verlag edition selene, Vienna
- Die Ursachen des Wachstums. Unsere Chancen zur Umkehr (R. Riedl, M. Delpos, editors), 1996. Verlag Kremayr und Scheriau: Vienna

== See also ==
- Peak Oil
- Club of Rome
