= Jonathan Gottschall =

American literary scholar (born 1972)

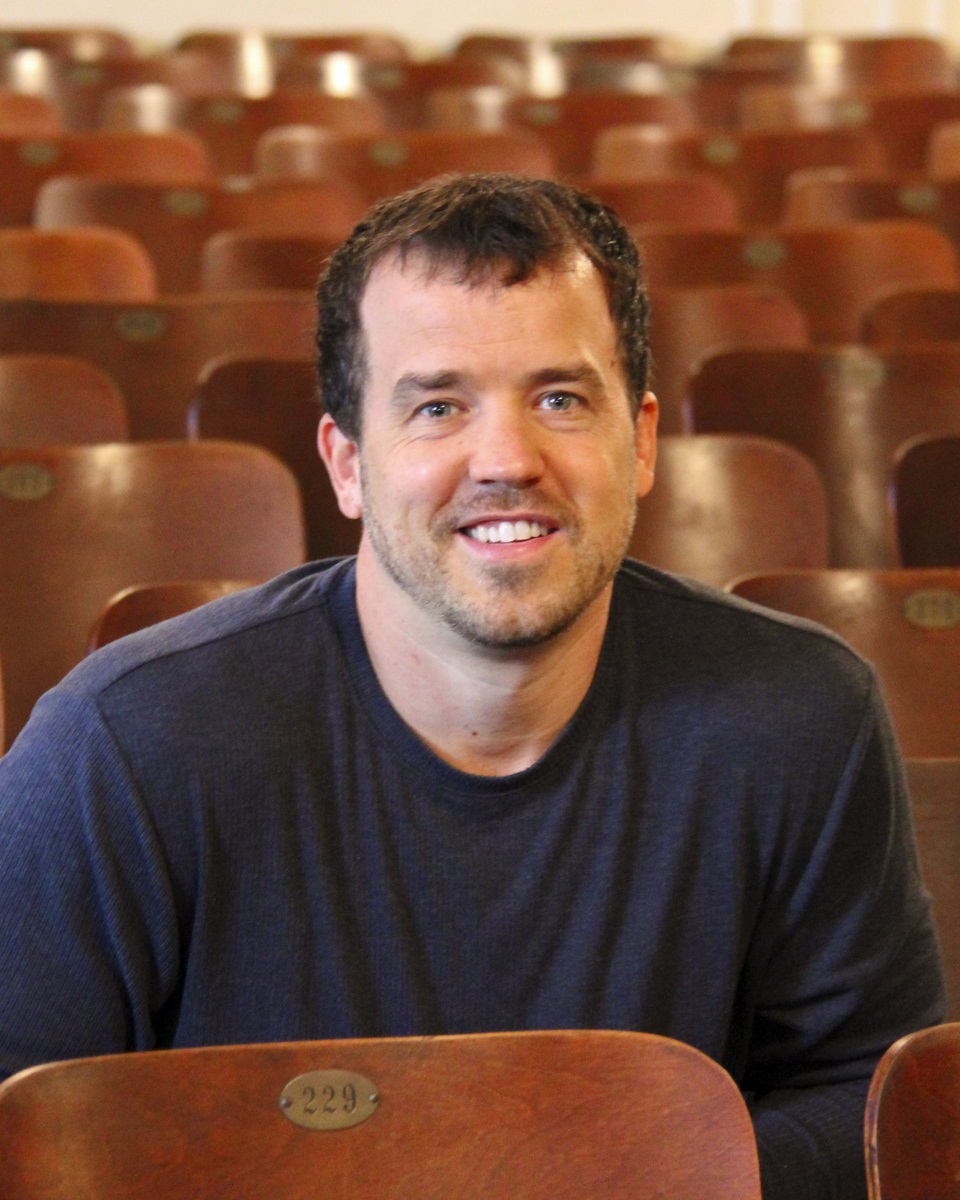
- 2011 photo by Sam Fee
- Born: September 20, 1972 (age 54); Washington, Pennsylvania, U.S.
- Occupation: Literary scholar
- Children: 2

Academic background
- Education: State University of New York at Binghamton (PhD)
- Doctoral advisor: David Sloan Wilson
- Website: www.jonathangottschall.com

Jonathan Gottschall (born September 20, 1972) is an American literary scholar specializing in literature and evolution. He holds the title of Distinguished Fellow in the English department of Washington & Jefferson College in Pennsylvania. He is the author or editor of eight books.

== Education ==
He completed his PhD in English at State University of New York at Binghamton, where he worked under David Sloan Wilson.

== Career ==
Gottschall was profiled by The New York Times and The Chronicle of Higher Education. His work was featured in an article in Science describing literature and evolution.

== Personal life ==
He is married with 2 daughters.

== Selected works ==
His work The Rape of Troy: Evolution, Violence and the World of Homer analyzes violence in the Homeric epic poems Iliad and Odyssey through the lens of evolutionary psychology. Gottschall argues that nearly all of the central violent conflicts in the epics originate in conflicts over women. He argues that this reflects an actual shortage of women in ancient Greek society driven by female infanticide and the practice of concentrating enslaved women in the households of powerful men, who were treated as the masters exclusive sexual property.

Literature, Science and a New Humanities advocates that the humanities, and literary studies in particular, need to avail themselves of quantitative and objective methods of inquiry as well as the traditional qualitative and subjective, if they are to produce cumulative, progressive knowledge, and provides a number of case studies that apply quantitative methods to fairy and folk tale around the world to answer questions about human universals and differences.

Gottschall's book, The Storytelling Animal: How Stories Make Us Human (Houghton Mifflin 2012), is about the evolutionary mystery of storytelling—about the way we shape stories, and stories shape us. A review by The Virginian-Pilot said "Gottschall assesses and accounts for that powerful narrative attraction in a compelling chronicle of his own...and it is a certifiable knee-slap, three-pipe, blue-moon ripsnorter. The Storytelling Animal was a New York Times Editor's Choice selection and a finalist for the Los Angeles Times Book Prize.

In the book The Professor in the Cage: Why Men Fight and Why We Like to Watch (Penguin 2015), Gottschall describes the three years he spent at a Mixed Martial Arts (MMA) gym trying to learn how to fight. He uses this experience as a way to explore the evolutionary psychology of violence, masculinity, and sports.

In 2021, Gottschall published The Story Paradox: How Our Love of Storytelling Builds Societies and Tears Them Down. Kirkus Reviews credited Gottschall with providing "fresh insights about the ways we understand reality." The book also received a harshly critical review by Timothy D. Snyder in the New York Times. This led to letters to the editor by Gottschall and Steven Pinker, whose work was also sharply criticized in the review.

== List of works ==
- The Literary Animal: Evolution and the Nature of Narrative (2005) – edited with David Sloan Wilson. ISBN 978-0810122864
- The Rape of Troy: Evolution, Violence and the World of Homer (2008)
- Literature, Science and a New Humanities (2008)
- Evolution, Literature and Film: A Reader (2010) – co-edited with Brian Boyd and Joseph Carroll.
- Graphing Jane Austen: The Evolutionary Basis of Literary Meaning (2012). Co-authored with Joseph Carroll, John A. Johnson, and Daniel Kruger.
- The Storytelling Animal: How Stories Make us Human (2012) ISBN 978-0547391403
- The Professor in the Cage: Why Men Fight and Why We Like to Watch (2015)
- The Story Paradox: How Our Love of Storytelling Builds Societies and Tears Them Down (2021) ISBN 978-1541645967
