= Harold Fromm =

Harold Fromm is an American academic and writer. He is University Associate in English at the University of Arizona as well as a member of the university's Institute of the Environment. He is the author of The Nature of Being Human: From Environmentalism to Consciousness and Academic Capitalism and Literary Value. His writings have appeared in a wide range of journals and he is a regular contributor to The Hudson Review.

Born in New York City, Fromm acquired a Bachelor of Arts at the City University of New York in 1954 before attaining a Master of Arts at Columbia University in 1956. He later received a Doctor of Philosophy from the University of Wisconsin in 1962. He authored or co-authored articles in publications such as The Evolutionary Review and Philosophy and Literature on topics such as ecology, evolution and consciousness. In his 1993 essay, Aldo Leopold: Aesthetic "Anthropocentrist", Fromm described Biocentrism as 'a recent invention that one might call cosmic "pro-lifeism".' He was also co-editor with Cheryll Glotfelty of the 1996 book The Ecocriticism Reader: Landmarks in Literary Ecology via through University of Georgia Press.

Fromm authored The Nature of Being Human: From Environmentalism to Consciousness in 2009 through Johns Hopkins University Press. He has been a regular contributor to The Hudson Review for more than 25 years. Reviewing 2013's Groping for Groups by E. O. Wilson and others in The Hudson Review, Fromm asked whether Wilson's stated "wish" for humans to bring about "a permanent paradise for human beings" would mean "to be group-selected in factories in the style of Huxley's [1932 novel] Brave New World.

Fromm has been a member of the Modern Language Association and the American Association for the Advancement of Science.

In 2020 Fromm was recognized by Marquis Who's Who as a leader in the field of humanities with the Albert Nelson Marquis Lifetime Achievement Award.
