= E. Lowell Kelly =

American psychologist (1905–1986)

- Born: November 15, 1905; Kokomo, Indiana
- Died: January 19, 1986 (aged 80); Ann Arbor, Michigan
- Education: Stanford University (PhD), Colorado College of Education (MEd), Purdue University (BS)
- Known for: President of American Psychological Association
- Scientific career
- Fields: Clinical psychology, personality psychology
- Workplaces: University of Michigan, Purdue University, University of Connecticut, University of Hawaii
- Thesis: An Experimental Attempt to Produce Artificial Chromoaesthesia by the Technique of Controlled Response (1930)
- Doctoral advisor: Walter R. Miles
- Other academic advisors: Lewis Terman
- Notable students: Donald W. Fiske, Lewis R. Goldberg, Roger Brown

Everett Lowell Kelly (November 15, 1905 – January 19, 1986) was an American clinical psychologist, professor of psychology at the University of Michigan, president of the American Psychological Association (1954–55), and chairman of the Executive Committee for the Boulder Conference on Graduate Training in Clinical Psychology (1948–49).

== Biography ==
Kelly was born on November 15, 1905, in Kokomo, Indiana. He earned his Bachelor of Science degree at Purdue University in 1926, and his Master of Arts degree from Colorado College of Education two years later. In 1930, he earned his PhD in Psychology from Stanford University. His advisor was Walter R. Miles, and his thesis focused on producing artificial chromaesthesia by the technique of controlled response.

After graduating, Kelly worked as a high school principal in Taiban, New Mexico. Later, he became a member of the psychology faculty and director of admissions at the University of Hawaii, followed by the University of Connecticut. While at Hawaii, Kelly performed a psychological examination for the wife of Lieutenant Thomas S. Massie, which played a notable role in the famous Massie Trial.

From 1939 to 1942, Kelly worked as a member of the faculty and Director of the Psychological Clinic at Purdue University. During World War II, Kelly enlisted in the U.S. Navy, where he worked on aviation medicine, aviation training, selection of pilots, and improvement of flight training methods. While in the Navy, Kelly was credited with discovering a common cause of military aviation crashes: cadets could not judge their distance from a plane with only one tail light. He introduced the notion of having two lights at a standard distance apart. For his contributions during the war, he was awarded the Secretary of Navy's Letter of Commendation.

After the war, Kelly moved to the University of Michigan, where he worked until his death in 1986. His scientific interests and contributions centered on assessment: job performance evaluations, psychological factors in marital compatibility, and assessment of qualifications for professional training. With Donald W. Fiske, he published a classic study in 1950 on the prediction of performance of clinical psychologists. His other focus was longitudinal research. Overall, he studied such varied phenomena as synesthesia, graphology, pharmacology, and apparent movement.

Kelly served on the board of directors for the American Psychological Association (APA) for six years and was president of the Division of Consulting Psychology and the Division of Clinical Psychology. He was elected president of APA and served in that role from 1954 to 1955. He was also an adviser to the National Selective Service and a consultant to agencies including the Veterans Administration (assessment of qualifications for professional training), the National Institutes of Health, the Educational Testing Service, the National Science Foundation, and the Agency for International Development. Furthermore, he directed the selection division of the Peace Corps.

Kelly died in Ann Arbor, Michigan, on January 19, 1986.

== Professional contributions ==
=== Performance assessment ===
Kelly conducted a number of studies assessing job performance and qualifications for professional training, with a particular emphasis on the field of clinical psychology. In his study of clinical psychology graduate students, Kelly evaluated numerous training programs from 40 different universities by a wide variety of techniques and made predictions concerning the students' probable success in training and their future job competence. Furthermore, Kelly developed criterion measures of the several tasks which clinical psychologists are expected to perform in their training and later careers. In longitudinal studies, Kelly examined scholarly productivity, clinical performance, satisfaction, and attitudes about clinical psychology among students following their graduation and entrance into the workforce. Similar studies were conducted for other training programs, including programs for aircraft pilots in the U.S. Navy. As a part of that program, Kelly also developed a pilot aptitude test and a flight training manual with standardized vocabularies for naval flight instructors. Kelly's research had a profound impact on the field of professional performance assessments, and several of his criterion measures and programs are continuously used in the field.

=== Marital compatibility ===
One of Kelly's key areas of study was marital compatibility, or identifying long-term patterns of marital adjustment that could be used as predictors of successful marriages in the future. His main findings were that personality adjustment, rather than social or cultural factors, were the basis for marital compatibility. In recent years, however, his research has fallen under scrutiny due to its emphasis on distinct gender roles and gender stereotypes that were universally endorsed at that time. For instance, the questionnaires used asked women to assess their skills as "cooks" and "housemakers", while men were asked to rate themselves based on their capabilities as "providers" and "handymen". Furthermore, his published papers assessments focused almost exclusively on personal lives. Nevertheless, Kelly's data on this topic is still considered to be an important basis for the research on marital compatibility.

=== Scientist-practitioner model ===
In 1948–49, Kelly chaired the Executive Committee for the Boulder Conference on Graduate Training in Clinical Psychology. The purpose of the conference was to come up with a standard training plan for clinical psychologists. The result of the conference was the creation of the Boulder model, also known as the scientist-practitioner model. According to this model, clinical graduate students need to adhere to the scientific method in their applied practices. To do that, they need to complete monitored field work, receive research training, and attend seminars and lectures that strengthen their knowledge of psychology. This model argues that having sufficient knowledge and background in both research academia and applied practice enhances the psychologist's skills and abilities.

== Influential publications ==
=== Assessment ===
- Kelly, E. L. (1954). Theory and techniques of assessment. Annual Review of Psychology, 5(1), 281–310.

=== Personality ===
- Kelly, E. L. (1955). Consistency of the adult personality. American Psychologist, 10(11), 659.
- Kelly, E. L. (1940). A 36 trait personality rating scale. The Journal of Psychology, 9(1), 97–102.
- Kelly, E. L. (1941). Marital compatibility as related to personality traits of husbands and wives as rated by self and spouse. The Journal of Social Psychology, 13(1), 193–198.

=== Clinical psychology training ===
- Kelly, E. L., & Fiske, D. W. (1950). The prediction of success in the VA training program in clinical psychology. American Psychologist, 5(8), 395.
- Kelly, E. L., & Fiske, D. W. (1951). The prediction of performance in clinical psychology. APA PsycNET. Retrieved 2016-03-15.
- Kelly, E. L., & Goldberg, L. R. (1959). Correlates of later performance and specialization in psychology: A follow-up study of the trainees assessed in the VA Selection Research Project. Psychological Monographs: General and Applied, 73(12), 1.
- Kelly, E. L.; Goldberg, L. R.; Fiske, D. W.; Kilkowski, J. M. (1978). "25 years later follow up study of graduate students in clinical psychology assessed in VA selection research project". American Psychologist. 33 (8): 745–755. doi:10.1037/0003-066x.33.8.746.
- Hilgard, E. R.; Kelly, E. L.; Luckey, B.; Sanford, R. N.; Shaffer, L. F.; Shakow, D. (1947). "Recommended graduate training program in clinical psychology". American Psychologist. 2 (12): 539–558. doi:10.1037/h0058236. PMID 18917473.

=== Marital compatibility ===
- Kelly, E. L. (1941). Marital compatibility as related to personality traits of husbands and wives as rated by self and spouse. The Journal of Social Psychology, 13(1), 193–198
- Kelly, E. L., & Conley, J. J. (1987). Personality and compatibility: a prospective analysis of marital stability and marital satisfaction. Journal of Personality and Social Psychology, 52(1), 27
- Westoff, C. F., Sagi, P. C., & Kelly, E. L. (1958). Fertility through twenty years of marriage: A study in predictive possibilities. American Sociological Review, 23(5), 549–556.
