= Donald T. Campbell =

American social scientist (1916–1996)

- Born: November 20, 1916; Grass Lake, Michigan, U.S.
- Died: May 6, 1996 (aged 79); Bethlehem, Pennsylvania, U.S.
- Education: University of California, Berkeley
- Scientific career
- Fields: Psychology, social science
- Workplaces: Lehigh University; Northwestern University

Donald Thomas Campbell (November 20, 1916 – May 6, 1996) was an American social scientist. He is noted for his work in methodology. He coined the term evolutionary epistemology and developed a selectionist theory of human creativity. A Review of General Psychology survey, published in 2002, ranked Campbell as the 33rd most cited psychologist of the 20th century.

== Biography ==
Campbell was born in 1916, and completed his undergraduate education in psychology at the University of California, Berkeley, where he and his younger sister, Fayette, graduated first and second, respectively, in the class of 1939.

After serving in the U.S. Naval Reserve during World War II, he earned his doctorate in psychology in 1947 from the University of California, Berkeley. He subsequently served on the faculties at Ohio State, the University of Chicago, Northwestern, Syracuse University, and Lehigh.

He taught at Lehigh University, which established the Donald T. Campbell Social Science Research Prizes. Prior to that, he was on the faculty of the Maxwell School of Syracuse University, 1979–1982, and Northwestern University from 1953 to 1979. He gave the William James Lecture at Harvard University in 1977. In June 1981, working with Alexander Rosenberg, Campbell organized an international conference held at Cazanovia, New York, to formulate the program of what he called an "Epistemologically Relevant Sociology of Science" (ERRES). By Campbell's own account, this project was at least premature.

Campbell was elected to the American Academy of Arts and Sciences and the National Academy of Sciences in 1973. In 1975, Campbell served as president of the American Psychological Association. He was elected to the American Philosophical Society in 1993.

Among his other honors, he received the American Psychological Association's Distinguished Scientific Contribution award, the Distinguished Contribution to Research in Education award from the American Educational Research Association, and honorary degrees from the Universities of Michigan, Florida, Chicago, and Southern California.

== Work ==
Campbell made contributions in a wide range of disciplines, including psychology, sociology, anthropology, biology, statistics, and philosophy.

=== Multitrait-multimethod matrix ===
Campbell argued that the sophisticated use of many approaches, each with its own distinct but measurable flaws, was required to design reliable research projects and to ensure convergent and discriminant validity. The paper he wrote with Donald W. Fiske to present this thesis, "Convergent and Discriminant Validation by the Multitrait-Multimethod Matrix", is one of the most frequently cited papers in the social science literature.

=== Blind variation and selective retention ===
Blind variation and selective retention (BVSR) is a phrase introduced by Campbell to describe the most fundamental principle underlying cultural evolution. In cybernetics, it is seen as a principle for describing change in evolutionary systems in general, not just in biological organisms. For example, it can also be applied to scientific discovery, memetic evolution, or genetic programming. As such, it forms a foundation for what has later been called universal Darwinism.

=== Evolutionary epistemology ===
Applying the BVSR principle to the evolution of knowledge, Campbell founded the domain of evolutionary epistemology. This can be seen as a generalization of Karl Popper's philosophy of science, which conceives the development of new theories as a process of proposing conjectures (blind variation) followed by the refutation (selective elimination) of those conjectures that are empirically falsified. Campbell added that the same logic of blind variation and selective elimination/retention underlies all knowledge processes, not only scientific ones. Thus, the BVSR mechanism explains not only creativity, but also the evolution of instinctive knowledge, and of our cognitive abilities in general.

=== "The Experimenting Society" ===
Campbell also had a vision for how public policy could be improved through the use of experimentation. He argued for a more collaborative method of public policy that involved various stakeholders and that used experimentation and data as a guide for decision making. The vision of this was laid out in his essay, "The Experimenting Society".

His research and book Experimental and Quasi-Experimental Designs for Research became the standard in policy-evaluation circles. Campbell did not start out intending to be a program evaluator, but his devotion to understanding causality, human behavior, and how to solve social questions led him there.

=== "Ethnocentrism of Disciplines and the Fish-Scale Model of Omniscience" ===
Campbell wrote an article in 1969 arguing that an obstacle to a "comprehensive, integrated multiscience" was that different areas of the behavioral sciences were clustered together and separated from other areas. That is, there was "a redundant piling up of highly similar specialties leaving interdisciplinary gaps". He wrote that often the approach taken to dealing with these gaps was to encourage multidisciplinary scholars, meaning those who are knowledgeable and competent in multiple areas, but that this was ill-guided because the level of knowledge that makes for good scholars requires specialisation. In his view, a wiser approach would be "invent[ing] alternative social organizations that will permit the flourishing of narrow interdisciplinary specialties." These interdisciplinary specialties would then fill in the gaps between disciplines.

== Further development of Campbell's ideas ==
In the 1990s, Campbell's formulation of the mechanism of "blind-variation-and-selective-retention" (BVSR) was further developed and extended to other domains under the labels of "universal selection theory" or "universal selectionism" by Gary Cziko, Mark Bickhard, and Francis Heylighen.

In 2000, a group of 85 social and behavioural scientists and social practitioners from 13 countries met in Philadelphia, USA and founded the Campbell Collaboration. The collaboration aims to address the need for an organisation that produces systematic reviews of research evidence on the effectiveness of social interventions. Many of the people involved in the establishment of the Campbell Collaboration were from Cochrane.

== Selected works ==
- 1959, with Donald W. Fiske, "Convergent and discriminant validation by the multitrait-multimethod matrix, In: Psychological Bulletin 56/1959 No. 2, pp. 81-105.
- 1963, with Julian C. Stanley, "Experimental and Quasi-Experimental Designs for Research.
- 1965, "Variation and selective retention in socio-cultural evolution". In: Herbert R. Barringer, George I. Blanksten and Raymond W. Mack (Eds.), Social change in developing areas: A reinterpretation of evolutionary theory, pp. 19–49. Cambridge, Massachusetts: Schenkman.
- 1969, "Ethnocentrism of disciplines and the fish-scale model of omniscience, In: M. Sherif & C. W. Sherif (Eds.), Interdisciplinary Relationships in the Social Sciences, Boston 1969, pp. 328-348
- 1970, "Natural selection as an epistemological model". In Raoul Naroll and Ronald Cohen (Eds.), A handbook of method in cultural anthropology, pp. 51–85. New York: National History Press.
- 1972, "On the genetics of altruism and the counter-hedonic components in human culture". Journal of Social Issues 28 (3), 21–37.
- 1974, "Downward causation in hierarchically organised biological systems". In Francisco Jose Ayala and Theodosius Dobzhansky (Eds.), Studies in the philosophy of biology: Reduction and related problems, pp. 179–186. London/Basingstoke: Macmillan.
- 1974, Unjustified variation and retention in scientific discovery. In Francisco Jose Ayala and Theodosius Dobzhansky (Eds.), Studies in the philosophy of biology: Reduction and related problems, pp. 141–161. London/Bastingstoke: Macmillan.
- 1974, "Evolutionary Epistemology." In The philosophy of Karl R. Popper edited by P. A. Schilpp, 412–463. LaSalle, IL: Open Court.
- 1975, "On the Conflicts between Biological and Social Evolution and between Psychology and Moral Tradition." American Psychologist 30: 1103–26.
- 1976, "Assessing the Impact of Planned Social Change," Occasional Paper Series, Paper #8, The Public Affairs Center, Dartmouth College.
- 1979, "Quasi-Experimentation: Design and Analysis Issues for Field Settings" with Thomas D. Cook.
- 1987, "Evolutionary epistemology." In: Evolutionary epistemology, rationality, and the sociology of knowledge, pp. 47–89.
- 1990, "Epistemological roles for selection theory," In Evolution, cognition, and realism: Studies in evolutionary epistemology, pp. 1–19.
- 1990, "Levels of organization, downward causation, and the selection-theory approach to evolutionary epistemology". In: G. Greenberg and E. Tobach (Eds.), Theories of the evolution of knowing, pp. 1–17. Hillsdale, NJ: Lawrence Erlbaum.
- 1994, "How individual and face-to-face group selection undermine firm selection in organizational evolution". In J.A.C. Baum and J.V. Singh (Eds.) Evolutionary dynamics of organizations, pp. 23–38. New York: Oxford University Press.
- 2003, with Bickhard, M. H., "Variations in variation and selection: The ubiquity of the variation-and-selective-retention ratchet in emergent organizational complexity." In Foundations of Science, 8(3), 215–282.

== See also ==
- Campbell's Law
- Downward causation
- American philosophy
- Entitativity
