= Darwin machine =

Type of iterative process

A Darwin machine (a 1987 coinage by William H. Calvin, by analogy to a Turing machine) is a machine that, like a Turing machine, involves an iteration process that yields a high-quality result, but, whereas a Turing machine uses logic, the Darwin machine uses rounds of variation, selection, and inheritance.

In its original connotation, a Darwin machine is any process that bootstraps quality by using all of the six essential features of a Darwinian process: A pattern is copied with variations, where populations of one variant pattern compete with another population, their relative success biased by a multifaceted environment (natural selection) so that winners predominate in producing the further variants of the next generation (Darwin's inheritance principle).

More loosely, a Darwin machine is a process that uses some subset of the Darwinian essentials, typically natural selection to create a non-reproducing pattern, as in neural Darwinism. Many aspects of neural development use overgrowth followed by pruning to a pattern, but the resulting pattern does not itself create further copies.

Darwin machine has been used multiple times to name computer programs after Charles Darwin.

== See also ==
- Artificial life
- Artificial intelligence
- "Darwin among the Machines"
- Evolutionary computation
- Evolutionary algorithm
- Genetic algorithm
- Universal Darwinism

== References and external links ==
- William H. Calvin (1987), "The brain as a Darwin Machine", Nature 330:33-34.
- William H. Calvin (1997) "The Six Essentials? Minimal Requirements for the Darwinian Bootstrapping of Quality," Journal of Memetics 1:1.
- George B. Dyson (1998), Darwin Among the Machines: The Evolution of Global Intelligence (Perseus 1997) (1998) ISBN 0-7382-0030-1.
- J. M. Manier (1996), Reason and Instinct (Robert Wright's The Moral Animal and Henry Plotkin's Darwin, Machines and the Nature of Knowledge). THEORY AND PSYCHOLOGY. 6 (2): 347–348. ISSN 0959-3543
- Henry Plotkin (1994), Darwin Machines and the Nature of Knowledge (Harvard University Press. ISBN 0-674-19280-X
- Henry Plotkin & Nicholas S. Thompson (1995), Darwin Machines and the Nature of Knowledge. Contemporary Psychology. 40 (12), 1179.
- E. A. Smith (1995), Darwin Machines and the Nature of Knowledge (Henry C. Plotkin). Politics and the Life Sciences : the Journal of the Association for Politics and the Life Sciences. 14 (2), 296. ISSN 0730-9384
