= Franz M. Wuketits =

Austrian biologist (1955–2018)

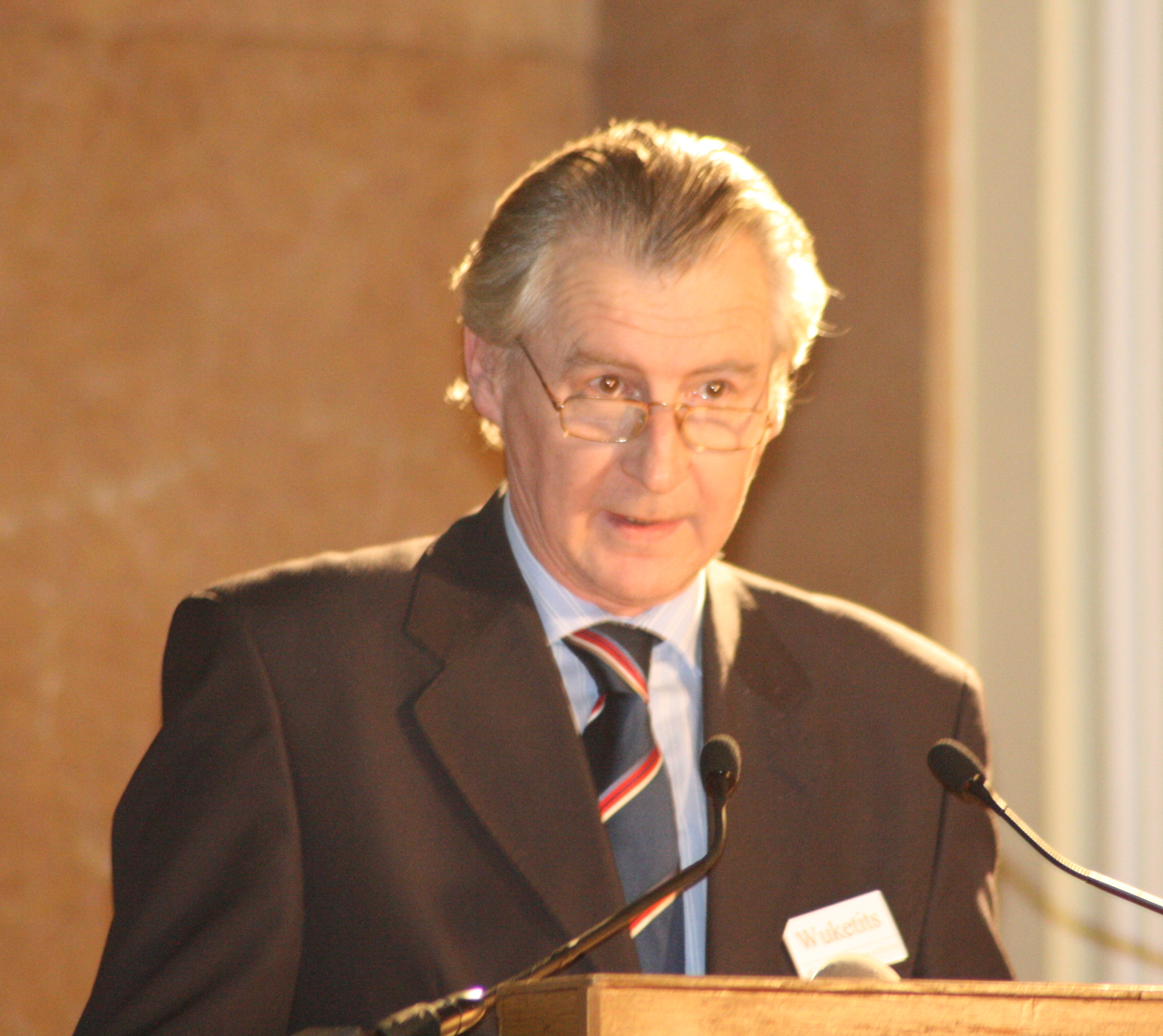
- Wuketits in 2007
- Born: Franz Manfred Wuketits; 5 January 1955; Parndorf, Burgenland, Austria
- Died: 6 June 2018 (aged 63); Vienna, Austria
- Occupation: Biologist
- Writing career
- Language: German

Franz Manfred Wuketits (5 January 1955 – 6 June 2018) was an Austrian biologist, university teacher and epistemologist. He wrote extensively on epistemology, the history and theory of biology, evolution theory, evolutionary ethics, evolutionary epistemology and sociobiology.

Wuketits co-founded the Austrian citizen initiative "Mein Veto" ("My veto") which campaigns against state encroachment in areas of personal liberty and morality. The Initiative is particularly well supported among Austria's relatively large Intellectual class, and includes among its financial backers the tobacco corporation BAT.

== Life ==
Between 1973 and 1978 Wuketits studied zoology, paleontology, philosophy and scientific theory at the University of Vienna. He received his doctorate in 1978, and progressed, still at Vienna, to a habilitation qualification in 1980 with a paper entitled "Scientific theory with particular reference to the Life sciences"

In 1982 he received national recognition in the form of the award of the Austrian Prize for Scientific Journalism.

From 1987 till 2004 he was employed at the University of Graz where he taught the philosophy of biology. He also had guest professorships at several other universities including the Vienna University of Technology (1998–2004) and, in Palma de Majorca, at the University of the Balearic Islands (2006, 2008, 2009, 2010).

Since 2002 he was on the board of the Konrad Lorenz Institute for Evolution and Cognition Research in Lower Austria. He was a member of the scientific advisory board of the Giordano Bruno Foundation which has as its mission "Support of Evolutionary Humanism". He also belongs to "Free Academy" in Berlin and to Vienna's Library Platform initiative. Other roles have included providing scientific input for the Kapfenberg (in Styria) Summer Academy till 2008 (which was the final year for the event).

For many years he was a co-producer/editor of the journal of the "Gesellschaft für kritische Philosophie Nürnberg" ("literally "Nuremberg Society from Critical Philosophy"/ GKPN), Aufklärung & Kritik which promotes free thought and humanist philosophy. He was on the editorial/advisory board of various other journals and publications (Biological Theory, Ludus Vitalis, La Nuova Critica, Universitas etc.). From 2005 until 2008 he was also the editor of Bioscop, the journal of the Austrian Biologist Association (ABA).

Wuketits on free will:

We have only the illusion of free will. An illusion that has developed over the course of human evolution. In daily life we do not notice that it is an illusion. We are not constantly evaluating whether free will is behind what we do or do not do.

........Each of us is to some extent predefined, on the one hand through the evolution of our species. All our activities arise from abilities that come from our evolutionary history. The priority here is always to survive and to reproduce. The cultural elements are merely refinements of underlying evolutionary strategies.

The second element is the individual biography. The older we get, the more we drag around our experiences, influences, desires, hopes, anxieties. We cannot separate ourselves from these. All the decisions that we take we take on the basis of factors deriving from this evolutionary history and our individual histories [leaving no space for free will].

Franz Wuketits
in conversation with Markus C. Schulte von Drach

== Published works ==
This list only partially complete.

- Wissenschaftstheoretische Probleme der modernen Biologie. Duncker & Humblot, Berlin 1978
- Kausalitätsbegriff und Evolutionstheorie. Die Entwicklung des Kausalitätsbegriffes im Rahmen des Evolutionsgedankens. Duncker & Humblot, Berlin 1980
- Biologie und Kausalität. Biologische Ansätze zur Kausalität, Determination und Freiheit. P. Parey, Berlin-Hamburg 1981
- Grundriß der Evolutionstheorie. Wissenschaftliche Buchgesellschaft, Darmstadt 1982 (2., verbesserte Auflage 1989)
- Biologische Erkenntnis: Grundlagen und Probleme. G. Fischer, Stuttgart 1983
- Evolution, Erkenntnis, Ethik. Folgerungen aus der modernen Biologie. Wissenschaftliche Buchgesellschaft, Darmstadt 1984
- Zustand und Bewußtsein. Leben als biophilosophische Synthese. Hoffmann und Campe, Hamburg 1985
- Schlüssel zur Biologie. ECON, Düsseldorf-Wien-New York 1986. Taschenbuchausgabe: Droemersche Verlagsanstalt Knaur, München 1990.
- Schlüssel zur Philosophie. ECON, Düsseldorf-Wien-New York 1987; Taschenbuchausgabe: Droemersche Verlagsanstalt Knaur, München 1991.
- Charles Darwin. Der stille Revolutionär. Piper, München-Zürich 1987
- Evolutionstheorien. Historische Voraussetzungen, Positionen, Kritik. Wissenschaftliche Buchgesellschaft, Darmstadt 1988 (broschierte Sonderausgabe 1995)
- Jenseits von Zufall und Notwendigkeit. Biologische und kulturelle Evolution des Menschen. Edition Riannon, Basel 1988
- Gene, Kultur und Moral. Soziobiologie – pro und kontra. Wissenschaftliche Buchgesellschaft, Darmstadt 1990
- Evolutionary Epistemology and its Implications for Humankind. SUNY Press, Albany, N.Y. 1990 ISBN 0-7914-0285-1
- Konrad Lorenz. Leben und Werk eines großen Naturforschers. Piper, München-Zürich 1990
- Verdammt zur Unmoral? Zur Naturgeschichte von Gut und Böse. Piper, München-Zürich 1993
- Die Entdeckung des Verhaltens. Eine Geschichte der Verhaltensforschung. Wissenschaftliche Buchgesellschaft, Darmstadt 1995 (2., überarbeitete Aufl. 2010)
- Soziobiologie. Die Macht der Gene und die Evolution sozialen Verhaltens. Spektrum Akademischer Verlag, Heidelberg 1997, ISBN 3-8274-0127-5. (Neuausgabe, Softcover 2012, ISBN 978-3-8274-3084-7)
- Naturkatastrophe Mensch. Evolution ohne Fortschritt. Patmos, Düsseldorf 1998; 2. Aufl. 1998. Taschenbuchausgabe: Deutscher Taschenbuch Verlag, München 2001.
- Eine kurze Kulturgeschichte der Biologie. Mythen, Darwinismus, Gentechnik. Wissenschaftliche Buchgesellschaft, Darmstadt 1998 (gleichzeitig erschienen im Primus Verlag, Darmstadt.)
- Die Selbstzerstörung der Natur. Evolution und die Abgründe des Lebens. Patmos, Düsseldorf 1999
- Warum uns das Böse fasziniert. Die Natur des Bösen und die Illusionen der Moral. Hirzel, Stuttgart-Leipzig 1999
- Evolution. Die Entwicklung des Lebens. C. H. Beck, München 2000 (2. Aufl. 2005).
- Humanität zwischen Hoffnung und Illusion. Warum uns die Evolution einen Strich durch die Rechnung macht. Kreuz, Stuttgart 2001 (verfasst gemeinsam mit Maria Wuketits)
- Der Affe in uns. Warum die Kultur an unserer Natur zu scheitern droht. Hirzel, Stuttgart/Leipzig 2002.
- Ausgerottet – ausgestorben. Hirzel, Stuttgart 2003.
- Darwin und der Darwinismus. C. H. Beck, München 2005.
- Bioethik. Eine kritische Einführung. C. H. Beck, München 2006.
- Der freie Wille. Die Evolution einer Illusion. Hirzel, Stuttgart 2007.
- Handbook of Evolution (als Herausgeber). Wiley-VCH Verlag, Weinheim 2007. 1500 S. in 3 Bd., ISBN 3-527-30622-6
- Lob der Feigheit. Hirzel, Stuttgart 2008. ISBN 978-3-7776-1602-5
- Wie viel Moral verträgt der Mensch? Eine Provokation. Gütersloher Verlagshaus, Gütersloh 2010. 224 S., ISBN 978-3-579-06754-4
- Wie der Mensch wurde, was er isst. Die Evolution menschlicher Nahrung, S. Hirzel Verlag, Stuttgart 2010, ISBN 978-3-777-62114-2
- Schwein und Mensch. Die Geschichte einer Beziehung. Westarp Wissenschaften: Die Neue Brehm-Bücherei Bd. 674, Hohenwarsleben 2011, ISBN 3-89432-446-5
- Die Boten der Nemesis: Katastrophen und die Lust auf Weltuntergänge. Gütersloher Verlagshaus, Gütersloh 2012, ISBN 978-3-579-06679-0
- Zivilisation in der Sackgasse. Plädoyer für eine artgerechte Menschenhaltung. Mankau-Verlag, Murnau a. Staffelsee 2012, ISBN 978-3-86374-054-2
- Animal irrationale – Eine kurze (Natur-)Geschichte der Unvernunft. Suhrkamp Verlag / edition unseld, Berlin 2013, ISBN 978-3-518-26049-4
- Was Atheisten glauben. Gütersloher Verlagshaus, Gütersloh 2014. ISBN 978-3-579-08503-6
- Atheismus oder Kulturchristentum?(gemeinsam mit Anton Grabner-Haider). Angelika Lenz Verlag, Neu-Isenburg 2014, ISBN 978-3-943624-05-2
