= Evolutionary aesthetics =

Evolutionary psychology theories

Evolutionary aesthetics refers to evolutionary psychology theories in which the basic aesthetic preferences of Homo sapiens are argued to have evolved in order to enhance survival and reproductive success.

Based on this theory, things like color preference, preferred mate body ratios, shapes, emotional ties with objects, and many other aspects of the aesthetic experience can be explained with reference to human evolution.

== Aesthetics and evolutionary psychology ==
Many animal and human traits have been argued to have evolved in order to enhance survival and reproductive success. Evolutionary psychology extends this to psychological traits including aesthetical preferences. Such traits are generally seen as being adaptations to the environment during the Pleistocene era and are not necessarily adaptative in our present environment. Examples include disgust of potentially harmful spoiled foods; pleasure from sex and from eating sweet and fatty foods; and fear of spiders, snakes, and the dark.

All known cultures have some form of art. This universality suggests that art is related to evolutionary adaptations. The strong emotions associated with art suggest the same.

== Landscape and other visual arts preferences ==
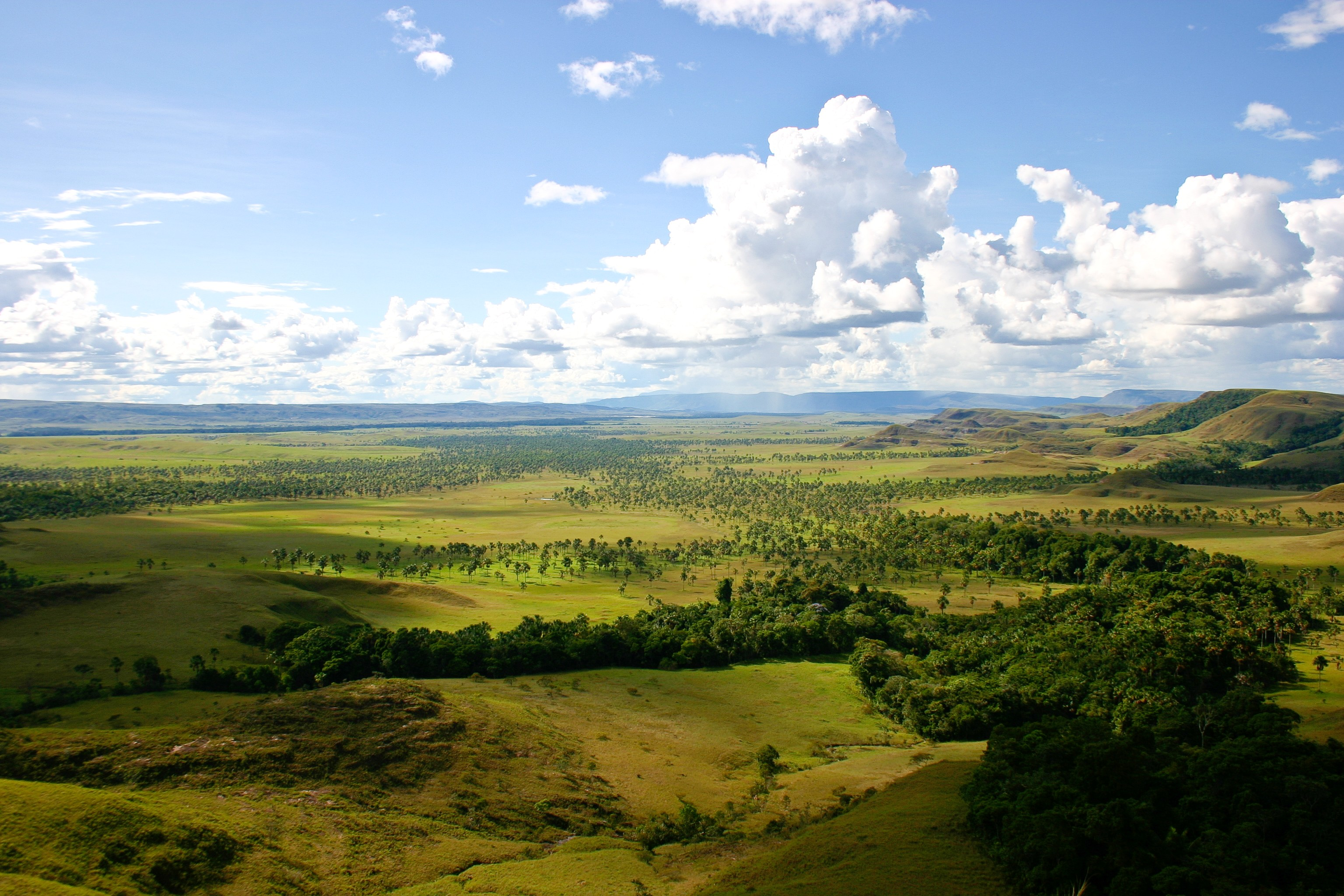
San Rafael Gran Sabana, Venezuela.

An important choice for a mobile organism is selecting a good habitat to live in. Humans are argued to have strong aesthetical preferences for landscapes which were good habitats in the ancestral environment. When young human children from different nations are asked to select which landscape they prefer, from a selection of standardized landscape photographs, there is a strong preference for savannas with trees. The East African savanna is the ancestral environment in which much of human evolution is argued to have taken place. There is also a preference for landscapes with water, with both open and wooded areas, with trees with branches at a suitable height for climbing and taking foods, with features encouraging exploration such as a path or river curving out of view, with seen or implied game animals, and with some clouds. These are all features that are often featured in calendar art and in the design of public parks.

A survey of art preferences in many different nations found that realistic painting was preferred. Favorite features were water, trees as well as other plants, humans (in particular beautiful women, children, and well-known historical figures), and animals (in particular both wild and domestic large animals). Blue, followed by green, was the favorite color. Using the survey, the study authors constructed a painting showing the preferences of each nation. Despite the many different cultures, the paintings all showed a strong similarity to landscape calendar art. The authors argued that this similarity was in fact due to the influence of the Western calendar industry. Another explanation is that these features are those evolutionary psychology predicts should be popular for evolutionary reasons.

== Physical attractiveness ==
Various evolutionary concerns have been argued to influence what is perceived to be physically attractive.

Such evolutionary based preferences are not necessarily static but may vary depending on environmental cues. Thus, availability of food influences which female body size is attractive which may have evolutionary reasons. Societies with food scarcities prefer larger female body size than societies having plenty of food. In Western society males who are hungry prefer a larger female body size than they do when not hungry.

=== Mate selection ===
An important adaptive function of courtship seems to be the selection of a mating partner with characteristics that would likely optimize reproductive success (selection for fitness). Such features include particular male or female characteristics that have aesthetic appeal to the opposite sex. Sexual selection tends to give rise to competition between individuals of the same gender. Darwin regarded such competition as having molded numerous aspects of animal behavior. Darwin particularly emphasized the striking evolution of aesthetic display in male birds. He also considered that a similar process had occurred in humans leading, for example, to the evolution of female beauty and sweeter voice and, in males, to the beard.

== Evolutionary musicology ==
Evolutionary musicology is a subfield of biomusicology that grounds the psychological mechanisms of music perception and production in evolutionary theory. It covers vocal communication in non-human animal species, theories of the evolution of human music, and cross-cultural human universals in musical ability and processing. It also includes evolutionary explanations for what is considered aesthetically pleasing or not.

== Darwinian literary studies ==
Darwinian Literary Studies (a.k.a. Literary Darwinism) is a branch of literary criticism that studies literature, including aesthetical aspects, in the context of evolution.

== Evolution of emotion ==
Aesthetics are tied to emotions. There are several explanations regarding the evolution of emotion.

One example is the emotion of disgust which has been argued to have evolved in order to avoid several harmful actions such as infectious diseases due to contact with spoiled foods, feces, and decaying bodies.

== Sexy son hypothesis, handicap principle, and arts ==
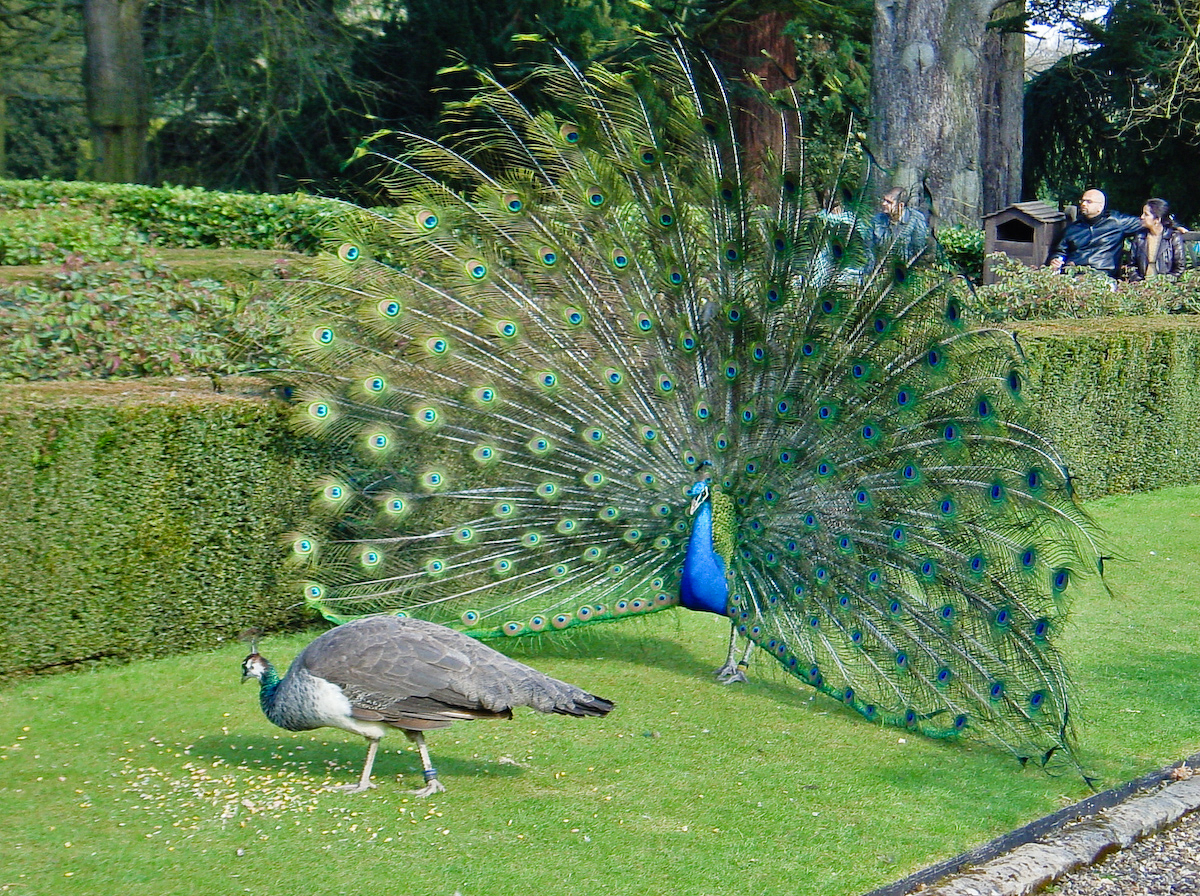
A male peacock does its best to court a female, dancing and displaying its extravagant plumage.

The sexy son hypothesis suggests that a female's optimal choice among potential mates is a male whose genes will produce male offspring with the best chance of reproductive success by having trait(s) being attractive to other females. Sometimes the trait may have no reproductive benefit in itself, apart from attracting females, because of Fisherian runaway. The peacock's tail may be one example. It has also been seen as an example of the handicap principle.

It has been argued that the ability of the human brain by far exceeds what is needed for survival on the savanna. One explanation could be that the human brain and associated traits (such as artistic ability and creativity) are the equivalent of the peacock's tail for humans. According to this theory superior execution of art was important because it attracted mates.
