= Evolutionary epistemology =

Ambiguous term applied to several concepts

Evolutionary epistemology refers to three distinct topics: (1) the biological evolution of cognitive mechanisms in animals and humans, (2) a theory that knowledge itself evolves by natural selection, and (3) the study of the historical discovery of new abstract entities such as abstract number or abstract value that necessarily precede the individual acquisition and usage of such abstractions. As a branch of inquiry in epistemology, evolutionary epistemology lies at the crossroads of philosophy and evolutionary biology.

== Cognition in biological evolution ==
Evolutionary epistemology can refer to a branch of inquiry in epistemology that applies the concepts of biological evolution to the growth of animal and human cognition. It argues that the mind is in part genetically determined and that its structure and function reflect adaptation, a nonteleological process of interaction between the organism and its environment. A cognitive trait tending to increase inclusive fitness in a given population should therefore grow more common over time, and a trait tending to prevent its carriers from passing on their genes should show up less and less frequently.

== Growth of knowledge ==
Evolutionary epistemology can also refer to a theory that applies the concepts of biological evolution to the growth of human knowledge, and argues that units of knowledge themselves, particularly scientific theories, evolve according to selection. In this case, a theory—like the germ theory of disease—becomes more or less credible according to changes in the body of knowledge surrounding it.

One of the hallmarks of evolutionary epistemology is the notion that empirical testing alone does not justify the pragmatic value of scientific theories, but rather that social and methodological processes select those theories with the closest "fit" to a given problem. The mere fact that a theory has survived the most rigorous empirical tests available does not, in the calculus of probability, predict its ability to survive future testing. Karl Popper used Newtonian physics as an example of a body of theories so thoroughly confirmed by testing as to be considered unassailable, but which were nevertheless overturned by Einstein's insights into the nature of space-time. For the evolutionary epistemologist, all theories are true only provisionally, regardless of the degree of empirical testing they have survived.

== Process of discovering new abstract entities ==
Evolutionary epistemology can also refer to the opposite of (onto)genetic epistemology, namely phylogenetic epistemology as the historical discovery and reification of abstractions that necessarily precedes the learning of such abstractions by individuals. Jean Piaget dismissed this possibility, stating

The fundamental hypothesis of genetic epistemology is that there is a parallelism between the progress made in the logical and rational organization of knowledge and the corresponding formative psychological processes. Well, now, if that is our hypothesis, what will be our field of study? Of course the most fruitful, most obvious field of study would be reconstituting human history: the history of human thinking in prehistoric man. Unfortunately, we are not very well informed about the psychology of Neanderthal man or about the psychology of Homo siniensis of Teilhard de Chardin. Since this field of biogenesis is not available to us, we shall do as biologists do and turn to ontogenesis. Nothing could be more accessible to study than the ontogenesis of these notions. There are children all around us."

Piaget was mistaken in so quickly dismissing the study of phylogenetic epistemology, as there is much historical data available about the origins and evolution of the various notational systems that reify different kinds of abstract entity.

Karl Popper gave its first comprehensive treatment in his 1970 article "Sketch of an Evolutionary Epistemology", after Donald T. Campbell had coined the phrase in a letter to Popper in 1963. Campbell wrote on evolutionary epistemology in 1974; Piaget alluded to it in 1968 and described the concept as one of five possible theories in The Origins of Intelligence in Children (1936).

== Criticism ==
In the scheme of K. Popper, the problem with which the process begins is not defined, making it impossible to predict the outcome to which the cycle of knowledge will lead.

P_{1} → TT → EE → P_{2}

A problem (P_{1}) gives rise to attempts to solve it by tentative theories (TT). These are submitted to a critical process of error elimination (EE). The errors which we detect give rise to new problems (P_{2}).

Additionally, the "specifically human language" is not included in the operation of the scheme. If "All organisms are problem solvers: problems arise with the emergence of life", then death is the absolute problem that creates various derivatives (P_{1,2,...,n}), which are overcome by the evolution of life and knowledge.

If language is included in the operation of the scheme, then the issue of qualitative transitions in knowledge is addressed, where new levels of problems become accessible only with the presence of a new language. Just as the world of Planck units is described only with the language of Quantum mechanics, and not by correcting errors in Classical mechanics, which is not reflected in Popper's scheme. The proposed scheme involving language:

L_{1} → P_{1} → TT → EE → L_{2} → P_{2}

Where L_{1} is the language that allows one to see the problem; L_{2} is the new language that allows one to see new spaces of problems.

== See also ==
- Behind the Mirror: A Search for a Natural History of Human Knowledge, also known as Die Rückseite des Spiegels, Versuch einer Naturgeschichte menschlichen Erkennens – 1973 philosophy book by Konrad Lorenz
- Evolutionary philosophy – Branch of philosophy of science
- Evolutionary psychology – Branch of psychology
- Memetics – Study of self-replicating units of culture
- Multiple discovery – Hypothesis about scientific discoveries and inventions
- Philosophy of biology – Subfield of philosophy of science
- Universal Darwinism – Application of Darwinian theory to other fields

=== Other people ===
- Peter Carruthers – American philosopher (born 1952)
- Vittorio Guidano – Italian neuropsychiatrist
- David Hull – American philosopher
- Konrad Lorenz – Austrian zoologist (1903–1989)
- Henry Plotkin – British psychologist (1940–2021)
- Rupert Riedl – Austrian zoologist
- Stephen Toulmin – English philosopher (1922–2009)
- Gerhard Vollmer – German physicist and philosopher (born 1943)
- Franz M. Wuketits – Austrian biologist (1955–2018)

== Sources ==
- Campbell, Donald T. (1963). Letter to Karl Popper, Popper archive 'Karl-Popper-Sammlung', University of Klagenfurt, box 282, folder 12; see Hans-Joachim Niemann, "Popper, Darwin and Biology", in G. Franco (ed.) Handbuch Karl Popper, Springer Nature 2019, 359–380.
- Harms, William F. (2004). Information and Meaning in Evolutionary Processes. Cambridge Studies in Philosophy and Biology. New York: Cambridge University Press.
- Alfred Holl; Dominique Maydt: Epistemological foundations of requirements engineering. In: Erkollar, Alptekin (ed.): Enterprise and business management. A handbook for educators, consulters and practitioners. Marburg: Tectum 2007, p. 31-58, ISBN 978-3-8288-9282-8.
- Piaget, Jean (1970). Genetic Epistemology. Woodbridge lectures delivered at Columbia University in October of 1968. Translated by Eleanor Duckworth. New York: Columbia University Press.
- Popper, Karl R. (1972). Objective Knowledge, An Evolutionary Approach. New York: Oxford University Press.
- Riedl, Rupert (1984). Biology of Knowledge: The Evolutionary Basis of Reason. Hoboken, NJ: John Wiley & Sons.
- Schilpp, P. A. (ed.) (1974). The Philosophy of Karl R. Popper. LaSalle, IL: Open Court. See Campbell's essay, "Evolutionary Epistemology" on pp. 412–463.
- Toulmin, Stephen (1972). Human Understanding, Volume 1: The Collective Use and Evolution of Concepts. Princeton, NJ: Princeton University Press.
