= Evolutionary anthropology =

Interdisciplinary study

Evolutionary anthropology, the interdisciplinary study of the evolution of human physiology and human behaviour and of the relation between hominids and non-hominid primates, builds on natural science and on social science. Various fields and disciplines of evolutionary anthropology include:

- human evolution and anthropogeny
- paleoanthropology and paleontology of both human and non-human primates
- primatology and primate ethology
- the sociocultural evolution of human behavior, including phylogenetic approaches to historical linguistics
- the cultural anthropology and sociology of humans
- the archaeological study of human technology and of its changes over time and space
- human evolutionary genetics and changes in the human genome over time
- the neuroscience, endocrinology, and neuroanthropology of human and primate cognition, culture, actions and abilities
- human behavioural ecology and the interaction between humans and the environment
- studies of human anatomy, physiology, molecular biology, biochemistry, and differences and changes between species, variation between human groups, and relationships to cultural factors

Evolutionary anthropology studies both the biological and the cultural evolution of humans, past and present. Based on a scientific approach, it brings together fields such as archaeology, behavioral ecology, psychology, primatology, and genetics. As a dynamic and interdisciplinary field, it draws on many lines of evidence to understand the human experience, past and present.

Studies of human biological evolution generally focus on the evolution of the human form. Cultural evolution involves the study of cultural change over time and space and frequently incorporates cultural-transmission models. Cultural evolution is not the same as biological evolution: human culture involves the transmission of cultural information (compare memetics), and such transmission can behave in ways quite distinct from human biology and genetics. The study of cultural change increasingly takes place through cladistics and genetic models.

== See also ==
- Anthropology – Scientific study of humans, human behavior, and societies
- Dual inheritance theory – Theory of human behavior
- Evolutionary neuroscience – Study of the evolution of nervous systems
- Evolutionary psychology – Branch of psychology
- Homininae – Subfamily of mammals
- Philosophy of biology – Subfield of philosophy of science
- Sociobiology – Subdiscipline of biology regarding social behavior
