= Brian Boyd =

New Zealand professor and literary critic

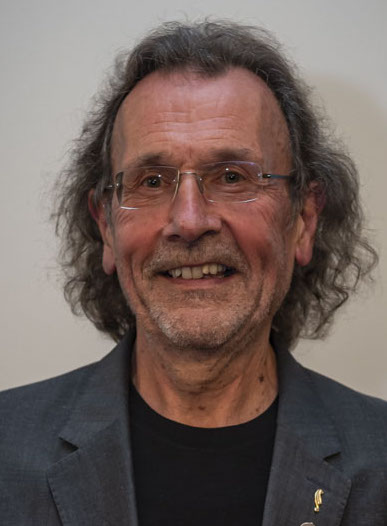
- Boyd in 2020
- Born: Brian David Boyd; 30 July 1952 (age 74); Belfast, Northern Ireland
- Known for: Expert on Vladimir Nabokov
- Awards: James Cook Research Fellowship (1996); Einhard-Preis (2001); Rutherford Medal (2020)

Academic background
- Education: University of Canterbury
- Alma mater: University of Toronto

Brian David Boyd (born 30 July 1952) is a professor of literature known primarily as an expert on the life and works of author Vladimir Nabokov and on literature and evolution. He is a University Distinguished Professor in the Department of English at the University of Auckland, New Zealand.

== Early life and education ==
Born in Belfast, Northern Ireland, Boyd emigrated to New Zealand as a child with his family in 1957.

In 1979 Boyd completed a PhD at the University of Toronto with a dissertation on Vladimir Nabokov's novel Ada or Ardor: A Family Chronicle, in the context of Nabokov's epistemology, ethics, and metaphysics. That year he took up a post-doctoral fellowship at the University of Auckland (on New Zealand novelist Maurice Gee) before being appointed a lecturer in English there in 1980.

== Work ==
Véra Nabokov, Nabokov's widow, in 1979 invited Boyd to catalogue her husband's archives, a task he completed in 1981. That year he also began researching a critical biography of Nabokov.

Nabokov's Ada: The Place of Consciousness (1985; rev. 2001) examined Ada in its own terms and in relation to Nabokov's thought and style. Vladimir Nabokov: The Russian Years (1990) and Vladimir Nabokov: The American Years (1991) won numerous awards and widespread acclaim and have been translated into seven languages.

In the 1990s Boyd edited Nabokov's English-language fiction and memoirs for the Library of America (3 vols., 1996) and, with lepidopterist Robert Michael Pyle, Nabokov's writings on butterflies (Nabokov's Butterflies, 2000). He also began a biography of philosopher Karl Popper, and work on literature and evolution. In 1996 Boyd was awarded a three-year James Cook Research Fellowship to write the biography of Popper.

Boyd's 1999 book, Nabokov's Pale Fire: The Magic of Artistic Discovery, attracted attention both for the novelty of Boyd's reading of Pale Fire and for his rejecting his own influential interpretation of the notoriously elusive novel in Vladimir Nabokov: The American Years.

In 2009 he published On the Origin of Stories: Evolution, Cognition and Fiction. Once compared in scope with Northrop Frye's Anatomy of Criticism (1957), On the Origin of Stories proposes that art and storytelling are adaptations and derive from play. It also shows evolutionary literary criticism in practice in studies of Homer's Odyssey and Dr. Seuss's Horton Hears a Who!.

As of 2019 Boyd continues to work on Nabokov, including ongoing annotations to Ada (since 1993), collected in a website (AdaOnline, since 2004), an edition of Nabokov's verse translations (Verses and Versions, 2008), of his letters to his wife (Letters to Véra, 2014), of his uncollected essays, reviews, and interviews (Think, Write, Speak, 2019) and of his unpublished lectures on Russian literature, and also especially on Shakespeare, Jane Austen, Art Spiegelman, and Popper.

Boyd's On the Origin of Stories helped precipitate an exhibition, On the Origin of Art, at the Museum of Old and New Art (Hobart, Australia) in 2016–17, in which he was one of four co-curators, the others being Marc Changizi, Geoffrey Miller and Steven Pinker.

In November 2020, Boyd was awarded the prestigious Rutherford Medal by the Royal Society Te Apārangi. It was the first year the medal's scope was widened to include the humanities.

Boyd's correspondence with Jeffrey Epstein over funding for a book on Lolita was published as part of the Epstein files in early 2026.

== Major works ==
- Nabokov's Ada: The Place of Consciousness (1985; rev.2001)
- Vladimir Nabokov: The Russian Years (1990)
- Vladimir Nabokov: The American Years (1991)
- Nabokov's Pale Fire: The Magic of Artistic Discovery (1999)
- Nabokov's Butterflies: Unpublished and Uncollected Writings (2000). Edited by Brian Boyd and Robert Michael Pyle
- Verses and Versions: Three Centuries of Russian Poetry Selected and Translated by Vladimir Nabokov (2008). Edited by Brian Boyd and Stanislav Shvabrin
- On the Origin of Stories: Evolution, Cognition, and Fiction (2009)
- Why Lyrics Last: Evolution, Cognition and Shakespeare's Sonnets (2012)
- Vladimir Nabokov, Letters to Véra (2014). Edited by Olga Voronina and Brian Boyd
- On the Origins of Art (2016). With Marc Changizi, Geoffrey Miller and Steven Pinker
