= Cognitive ecology of religion =

Study of links between beliefs and environment

Cognitive ecology of religion is an integrative approach to studying how religious beliefs covary with social and natural dynamics of the environment. This is done by incorporating a cognitive ecological perspective to cross-cultural god concepts. Religious beliefs are thought to be a byproduct of domain-specific cognitive modules that give rise to religious cognition. The cognitive biases leading to religious belief are constraints on perceptions of the environment, which is part and parcel of a cognitive ecological approach. This means that they not only shape religious beliefs, but they are determinants of how successfully cultural beliefs are transmitted.

Furthermore, cognition and behavior are inextricably linked, so the consequences of cultural concepts are associated with behavioral outcomes (i.e., continued interactions with the environment). For religion, behaviors often take the form of rituals and are similarly executed as a consequence of beliefs. Because the religious beliefs distributed in a population are relevant to their behavioral strategies and fine-tuned by natural selection, cross-cultural representations of gods and their characteristics are hypothesized to address ecologically relevant challenges. In other words, religious beliefs are thought to frequently involve solutions, insofar as evolved cognitive equipment can build them, to social and natural environmental problems faced by a given population.

== Religious cognition ==
Research in evolutionary psychology suggests that the brain is a coordinated network of domain-specific modules corresponding to various adaptations that emerged in our evolutionary history. Most claim that a capacity for religious thoughts is not a modular adaptation itself, but an evolutionary byproduct of multiple integrated mechanisms that arose independently and are designed for different functions. These modules are co-opted to give rise to religious thinking patterns, and they include theory of mind, essential psychology and the hyperactive agency detection device. Moreover, the cultural transmission of these ideas is contingent upon them being minimally counterintuitive.

=== Theory of mind ===
Theory of mind (ToM) is a capacity to attribute mental states, complete with thoughts, emotions and motivations, to other social agents. This adaptation is ubiquitous in primitive forms among various social species, but the complexity of human social life for long stretches of evolutionary history has facilitated a rich understanding of others' mental experiences to match. Cases of autism have been cited in support for the proposition that ToM is a distinct modular adaptation because of its distinctly narrow impact on ToM capacity. ToM is thought to lend itself to an intuitive sense of mind-body dualism, where the material body is animated by a non-material self (i.e., a "soul").

=== Essentialism ===
Folk psychology among humans is characterized by essential thinking, or a tendency to interpret objects in terms of "essences." This means that attributions of objects' underlying realities are intuitively inferred from a fuzzy set of the object's ontological features. Cognitive interpretations of essence give rise to concepts of purity, simplified good and evil concepts, and intuitive senses of meaning applied to teleology.

=== Hyperactive agency detection device ===
The capacity for agent detection has been an important modular adaptation for predator avoidance in humans. Some have called this mechanism a hyperactive agency detection device because of its fairly high rate of erroneous agency applications. In a potential predator situation, humans are forced to interpret an object's ontological features, infer agency or non-agency, and execute a behavioral response. Evolutionary theorists have cited the relatively low costs of incorrect agency inferences and the severe fitness costs of detection failure as a reason to suspect that a tendency to interpret naturalistic processes as agent behaviors is an adaptation. This creates a cognitive bias that leads humans to reason about objects and processes in agentive terms. This is particularly foundational to beliefs in a god or gods.

=== Minimally counterintuitive beliefs ===
The integration of ToM, hyperactive applications of agency and essential psychology ultimately renders a cognitive tendency for humans to interact with the naturalistic processes of the world with the intentional stance. This is a perspective from which humans reason that objects and processes may be enacting behaviors intentionally, with meaningful, rational mental states of their own.

Religious beliefs are successfully transmitted if they are compatible with the cognitive tools that reconstruct them upon reception. This means that they must be minimally counterintuitive, or that they violate few enough ontological features of an object or process, to make general sense while remaining memorable violations nonetheless. For example, the concept of a ghost exploits existing intuitions about mind-body dualism and only violates the usual coupling of mind and body. This creates a memorable concept of a non-material person that can move through walls and have motives of its own. On the other hand, a highly counterintuitive idea about an object that violates several of its ontological features, like a jealous Frisbee, is less likely to be culturally transmitted. This is because it is cognitively demanding, not easily reconstructed by the brain and thus, not easily reasoned about and remembered.

Religious behaviors associated with culturally transmitted god concepts can be conceptualized as phenotypic strategies associated with the informational makeup of that cultural concept. Successfully transmitted religious concepts typically involve minimally counterintuitive violations of the intentional stance, which serves a cognitive constraint of cultural evolution. However, ecological factors also play a role in determining which religious behaviors (and their god concepts) are more likely to be replicated. This means that religious rituals associated with salient representational models of gods' minds and concerns are more likely to survive when they are adaptive strategies.

== Ecology of god concepts ==
Cross-culturally, representational models of gods' minds take an array of diverse forms, such as anthropomorphic or zoomorphic figures, abstract forces, or some combination of these. Models of gods' minds typically fall within a spectrum between two extremes: on one end there are Big Gods, and on the other there are Local Gods. Big Gods are usually moralistic, punitive and omniscient, whereas Local Gods are often concerned about ritual behaviors, amoral and limited in knowledge. The subject matter that gods are believed to care across cultures fall into three categories, but may involve an admixture of more than one. These categories are (1) behaviors toward other people, (2) behaviors toward the gods themselves and (3) behaviors toward nature and/or the environment. While people impute these concerns to gods' minds, they often correspond to ecological challenges. This correspondence establishes why religious ideas often covary with ecological problems in the social and natural world: because these ideas enact behavioral strategies that solve them.

=== Large-scale cooperation ===
Cases of large-scale cooperation in complex societies are a widely studied example of a socioecological problem that religious beliefs address. Existing models of human cooperation have included kin selection, reciprocal altruism, indirect reciprocity and competitive helping. These models are robust across certain conditions likely relevant to the Pleistocene, but cooperation is easily eroded in large-scale, complex societies with frequently anonymous interactions between strangers. This is because profitable defections dominate cooperative strategies due to a lack of significant threats of punishment to defectors. For large-scale cooperation to succeed, a cultural coordination solution stabilized by sanction threats must exist.

Religious rules addressing moral behavior are cultural coordination devices that can expand the scale of cooperative behavior by motivating prosociality. The most important stipulation here is that these devices must be enforced by punishment threats for people who do not behave prosocially. Frequent instances of anonymity in large-scale societies and the costs associated with punishment undermine sanction threats, but widespread beliefs in morally punitive and omniscient gods effectively outsource the punishment costs to a pervasive social monitor. This can effectively motivate widespread prosocial behavior in large-scale, complex societies.

This has been empirically supported from a few different angles. For instance, the cross-cultural prevalence of omniscient, moralistic gods (i.e., Big Gods) is positively correlated with society size and complexity. Examples of sharing behaviors in experimental economic games played by large-scale societies also reveal more generous behaviors when individuals are primed with Big God concepts before the game. These shifts toward prosociality are not replicated when similar experiments are applied to small-scale societies. Another recent cross-cultural study compiled experimental economic game data from multiple large- and small-scale societies around the world, where people with various religious beliefs played with local or distant people who were often of the same religion. When distant strangers of the same religion were paired in a game, their sharing behaviors were significantly more generous if their common beliefs involved Big God concepts. The researchers of this study argue that this supports the hypothesis stating that widespread beliefs in omniscient, morally punitive Big Gods may have contributed to the expansion of prosocial behavior.

=== Costly signaling ===
Concerns attributed to gods about how people behave toward the gods themselves are widespread and not easily disentangled from specific ecological conditions. The reason is intuitive; rational agents who do not care about their treatment are counterintuitive. Researchers investigating the socioecological functions of ritual behaviors in deference to gods claim that functionally, these rituals serve as costly signals of commitment to the group. Costly ritual displays are particularly public and ubiquitous in small-scale societies, functioning as social devices that promote intragroup cohesion. Reputations related to trustworthiness can be significantly based on adherence to ritual behavior expectations, and fulfillment of these expectations are often a joint function of other behavioral strategies relevant to separate domains of gods' concerns. More broadly, religious costly signals are an implicit expression of honest commitment to the rest of the group, indicating that the signaler is a dedicated part of other aspect of the group's coordinated solution strategies. In small- and large-scale societies alike, these rituals often coexist with other categories of gods' concerns.

=== Resource management ===
Resource management and the prevention of material insecurity are more commonly associated with gods' concerns among small-scale societies. While other aspects of religious belief often address social interactions, problems of resource acquisition and security extend from attributed gods' concerns about peoples' interactions with their natural environment. An example of this effect has been alluded to by anthropologist Marvin Harris, who wrote about the economic reasons that Hindu beliefs, holding cows as sacred and forbidden from slaughter, were adaptive. According to Harris, the long-standing and stable benefits derived from many Hindu peoples' use of cows for labor and sources of fuel and fertilizer seemed to outweigh the costs of not eating them. Another ethnographic example of an adaptive use of animal resources was described by Roy Rappaport in 1984, who considered the reasons for ritual pig sacrifice in Papua New Guinea during times of intergroup conflict. These pigs were consuming local peoples' resources and creating resource insecurities that put a strain on the local groups, escalating the intergroup competition for resources and fueling their conflict. Thus, the ritualistic sacrifices alleviated the strain on local resources and mitigated the hostilities between groups. Furthermore, human behavioral ecology researchers have more recently studied burning practices among the Australian Martu people and the consequential increases in local biodiversity. These authors, in an ethnographic discussion of the Martu people, note that these burning practices stem from religious beliefs that their practices allow the world to continue existing as they know it.

Another ethnographic example of religious beliefs facilitating resource management comes from the Tyva people, a pastoralist population in southern Siberia. They associate ritual structures called cairns with local spirit masters (cher eezi). These structures demarcate local territories in which spirit masters reside, and the expectation to stop and give prayer offerings out of respect to cher eezi is embedded in peoples' beliefs about them. The cher eezi are believed to be amoral and care mostly about activity within their sacred territories, such as hunting and overexploiting resources that belong to them. More recently, Tyva people have begun facing new challenges associated with urbanization (e.g., pollution, alcohol abuse), and the cher eezi have been more frequently believed to be concerned about these same problems.

== See also ==
- Cognitive science of religion – Study of religious thought and behavior
- Evolutionary origin of religions – Emergence of religious behavior discussed in terms of natural evolution
- Evolutionary psychology of religion – Study of religious belief using evolutionary psychology principles
- Psychology of religion – Analytic approach to religion
