= Organizational adaptation =

Concept in organization theory

Organizational adaptation (sometimes referred to as strategic fit and organizational congruence) is a concept in organization theory and strategic management that is used to describe the relationship between an organization and its environment. The conceptual roots of organizational adaptation borrows ideas from organizational ecology, evolutionary economics, industrial and organizational psychology, and sociology. A systematic review of 50 years worth of literature defined organizational adaptation as "intentional decision-making undertaken by organizational members, leading to observable actions that aim to reduce the distance between an organization and its economic and institutional environments".

Adaptation is a concept that has been studied from multiple perspectives and, as a result, transcends multiple levels of analysis including organizations, populations of organizations, and organizational fields.

== Historical Development ==
Studies of organization adaptation are mainly concerned with the evolution of organizations in conjunction with the environments in which they are situated. Early works emphasized a notion that managers possessed the ability to determine the optimal means by which organizations could be structured. Aspects of adaptation began with a focus inside organizations and the adapting of internal structures to achieve the highest rates of success (see scientific management as an example). The study of adaptation evolved to focus on the interplay between strategy and structure, classically studied by Chandler (1962) which laid the foundation for subsequent studies of adaptation that elaborated more explicitly on the environment.

The two most prominent seminal works of adaptation evolved to describe the relationship between organizations and their environments. Cyert and March (1963), in their influential work, A Behavioral Theory of the Firm, emphasized the adaptation of decision rules that facilitated the ways that organizations learned to cope with uncertain environments. Relatedly, Lawrence and Lorsch (1967) elaborated upon the notion of "fit" between organizational structures and the various sub-environments in which they operated. Organizations that were best able to match their organization structures to sub-environments outperformed other organizations, spawning a rich literature in contingency theory.

=== Contrarian Views ===
Beginning in the 1970s, scholars became skeptical of the emphasis on the capacity for managers to influence their environments. Sociological perspectives emerged as a result, emphasizing the role and strength of the environment in restraining the ability for managers to influence the success of organizations. Particularly prominent in this regard was the work of organizational ecologists that leveraged ideas from evolutionary biology to explain the natural selection of organizations. For ecologists, managers had little agency and organizational survival was determined primarily by the environment itself.

=== The Interrelationship between Adaptation and Selection ===
Broader ecological views emerged from early works that emphasized managers and subsequent works that emphasized environmental forces. Frameworks were developed that focused on the interplay between organizations and environments. Hrebeniak and Joyce (1985) specifically elaborated upon the interplay between strategic choice and environmental determinism, suggesting that both resided along a continuum that distinguished various forms of adaptation. Adaptation could, therefore, exist in multiple modes. Subsequent work by Levinthal (1997) entitled Adaptation on Rugged Landscapes further elaborated upon the notion that both adaptive and selective forces were simultaneously at play for organizations depending upon how "tightly coupled" (or interdependent) organizational structures were in relation to their environments. Environments were determined to be rugged because there are several local optimum points that related specifically to the intricacies of each organization's design.

Given such broad historical roots and biological connotations, organizational adaptation is often studied alongside related concepts to expose its presence. As a result, several concepts are closely related to adaptation.

== Core Concepts Related to Adaptation ==
Adaptation is often contrasted with inertia and selection (see organizational ecology) and reflected as survival, growth, or performance. The attributes that reflect the concept of adaptation do not fully reflect either survival nor success for organizations, however, as biological notions of adaptation do not easily translate to organizations. Adaptation, as a standalone concept, does have distinguishable attributes from its related concepts. More specifically, organizational adaptation is premised on organizational decision-making that is intentional, whereby decision-makers are aware of their environment; relational, in that organizations and environments influence one another; conditioned, in that environmental characteristics evolved with other organizations’ actions; and convergent, in that organizations attempt to move closer to a set of environmental characteristics.

== Progression of Adaptation Research ==
The widespread use of adaptation and its relationships to many theoretical perspectives has led to a diverse body of literature that spans multiple levels of analysis and multiple topics of study. A systematic review of 50 years worth of academic literature on adaptation uncovered 6 theoretical perspectives and 16 unique topics that have been studied with the concept of adaptation (see the interactive model of topics). Broadly, studies of organizational adaptation focus on 3 main areas: how do organizations pursue adaptation, what constrains organizational efforts to adapt, and what are the environmental forces that initiate adaptation.

=== The Pursuit of Adaptation ===
Pursuits of adaptation primarily follow the traditions that emphasize how managers influence the adaptation process and, therefore, focus mainly on decision-making. Organizations that recognize environmental change and make decisions to reconfigure resources or enter new markets are viewed as adapting accordingly. In this way, psychological perspectives that emphasize the cognition of managers play a strong role in explaining adaptation. Strategic perspectives that emphasize the capabilities of organizations also feature prominently in pursuits of adaptation.

=== Internal Factors that Constrain or Enable Adaptation ===
Drawing from perspectives that restrict the abilities of managers to fully influence or align to their environments, constraints (or conditions) on adaptation are also broadly studied. Organizations either needed to account for the internal relationships between core strengths that evolve with environments over time to achieve success or they needed to account for the fact that regulations may impose restrictions on organizations as they adjusted to their environments. The set of studies focused on the factors that condition adaptation, therefore, tend to focus on the outcomes of performance, survival, or legitimacy for organizations.

=== The Influence of Environments on Adaptation ===
A relatively smaller set of academic articles highlights that environments can initiate (or impose, in some cases) adaptation. The perspectives drawn upon to make the case for environments are evolutionary in nature and focus on variation, selection, and retention models that were popularized by Campbell (1965). Prominent works in this area of adaptation research highlight the interplay between organizations and environments whereby environmental forces are relatively stronger than strategic decisions, although adaptation remained present as Haveman and Rao demonstrated in their 1997 study of the early thrift industry

== Issues in Adaptation Research ==
The three areas in which adaptation has been studied has led to some conceptual challenges that stem from the various levels and perspectives from which organizational adaptation has been studied. A systematic review identified 11 difficulties in adaptation research, which is summarized broadly in the following table.

| Difficulty Area | Difficulty Description |
|---|---|
| Adaptation is Studied as both a Factor Leading to Convergence and an Outcome of Convergence | Functionalist Adaptation Fallacy: decisions are assumed to be effective means of converging with environments |
| Adaptation is Studied as both a Factor Leading to Convergence and an Outcome of Convergence | Adaptation without Strong Performance: organizations may converge with an environmental characteristic and not reap the benefits of strong performance |
| Adaptation is Studied as both a Factor Leading to Convergence and an Outcome of Convergence | Adaptation Depends on Competition: peer organizations may respond to decisions made that negate the benefits of an adaptive decision |
| Adaptation is Difficult to Observe | Continuous Change: organizations frequently make changes that may reduce the need for subsequent changes |
| Adaptation is Difficult to Observe | Asymmetric Causality: the presence of a condition that leads to inertia does not necessarily imply that its absence leads to adaptation |
| Adaptation is Difficult to Observe | Strategic Non-Adaptation: organizations may intentionally choose to avoid adaptation if it does not align with organizational aspirations |
| Adaptation is Difficult to Observe | Unobservable Adaptive Ability: organizations may possess the ability to adapt without an environmental opportunity to do so |
| Adaptation Occurs at Multiple Interdependent Levels | Adaptation Depends on Environments: environments may move in the direction of organizations just as much as organizations move in the direction of environments |
| Adaptation Occurs at Multiple Interdependent Levels | Environmental Multiplicity: organizations plausibly adapt to multiple environments at multiple levels simultaneously |
| Adaptation Occurs at Multiple Interdependent Levels | Co-evolution Across Levels: decisions made by the organizations plausibly change the environmental conditions and vice versa |
| Adaptation Occurs at Multiple Interdependent Levels | Adaptation as Transitory: adaptation does not occur at points in time but over periods of time |

== See also ==
- Adaptive management
- Adaptive performance
- Biocultural evolution
- Bounded rationality
- Complex adaptive system
- Open and closed systems in social science
- Organizational behaviour
- Organizational development
- Organizational field
- Organizational learning
- Organizational performance
- Organizational studies
- Organizational theory
