= Cooperation =

Groups working or acting together

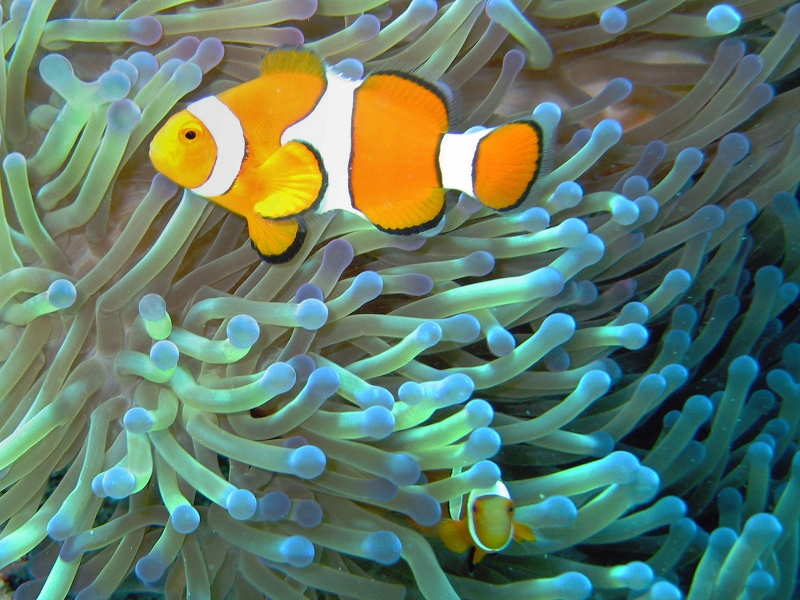
Many animal species cooperate with each other in mutual symbiosis. One example is the ocellaris clownfish, which dwells among the tentacles of Ritteri sea anemones. The anemones provide the clownfish with protection from their predators (which cannot tolerate the stings of the sea anemone's tentacles), while the fish defend the anemones against butterflyfish (which eat anemones)

Cooperation (now much less often written as co-operation in British English and very rarely "coöperation" in American English) takes place when a group of organisms works or acts together for a collective benefit to the group as opposed to working in competition for selfish individual benefit. In biology, many animal and plant species cooperate both with other members of their own species and with members of other species with whom they have (symbiotic or mutualistic) relationships.

== Among humans ==
Humans cooperate for the same reasons as other animals: immediate benefit, genetic relatedness, and reciprocity, but also for particularly human reasons, such as honesty signaling (indirect reciprocity), cultural group selection, and for reasons having to do with cultural evolution.

Language allows humans to cooperate on a very large scale. Certain studies have suggested that fairness affects human cooperation; individuals are willing to punish at their own cost (altruistic punishment) if they believe that they are being treated unfairly. Sanfey, et al. conducted an experiment where 19 individuals were scanned using MRI while playing an ultimatum game in the role of the responder. They received offers from other human partners and from a computer partner. Responders refused unfair offers from human partners at a significantly higher rate than those from a computer partner. The experiment also suggested that altruistic punishment is associated with negative emotions that are generated in unfair situations by the anterior insula of the brain.

It has been observed that image scoring, where a participant learns of their counterpart's prior behavior or reputation, promotes cooperative behavior in situations where direct reciprocity is unlikely. This implies that in situations where reputation and status are involved, humans tend to cooperate more.

Many organisms other than apes, such as fish, birds, and insects exhibit cooperative behavior: teaching, helping, and self-sacrifice, and can coordinate to solve problems. The author Nichola Raihani argues that Earth is a history of teamwork, collective action, and cooperation. Its a selfish behavior, working together towards solving a problem, because it yields success to engage cooperatively, typically this means work in effort towards solving a problem can often only ever be solved by a cooperative effort, for example for most individuals working cooperatively but especially within families has made cooperation behaviors be generally aggregated together to accomplish major problem solving for survival, like migration and success, particularly familial success. Democracy for instance was created because of three key traits; social comparison, engagement with collaboration, and wanting to be someone who shares, which all stems from the desire to not monopolize all resources but to gradually accept the divvying up of resources of collaboration (cliques, teams or greater communities).

When clients are watching and see the current interaction reacting badly, then sometimes everyone else who is waiting will stop watching or go elsewhere, thus they may provide a better service when a client can be made aware of their ability to exhibit cooperative behavior. This has been observed in generosity 'tournaments' or one-upmanship behavior among people, and among cleaner fish, and it's an example of costly behavior that engages in that is about a future underlying benefit that one can gain by gaining those clients, for human beings its particularly the case that unconditional generosity is a particular response which suggests perception of a sexual role advantage as underlining such behavioral choices amongst men when undergoing competitively this way in the presence of attractive females or online.

Every human achievements are actually reliant on the cooperation efforts that have been created by others, from the cursory to the truly magnificent, whether its a mundane achievement or the greatest achievements, it relies on cooperation. We're biologically geared to ensuring survival by social instincts like much of the food early human beings ate were hunted or gathered, these are aspects of cooperation that alone cannot be done. To avoid the problem of starvation we had to band together like our distant ancestors if we wish to continue existing. However primates largely lived on large salad bowls so they avoided such pressure, narrowing what they need as a evolutionary strategy. We had to not only cooperate to eat, we also readily need to learn other important life skills to be able continue this strategy and had to raise our children that couldn't survive without essential food.

Kin selection or related inclusive fitness theory is defined as a reproductive strategy that favors the success of an organism's relatives, even when it is not in an organism's own best interest, it's highly relevant to human social behavior, relationships and cooperation.

In the individual psychology of Alfred Adler, a definition of social instinct is; an innate drive for cooperation is what invariably leads individuals to inculcate social interest and the common good to help them achieve self-realization.

== Among other animals ==
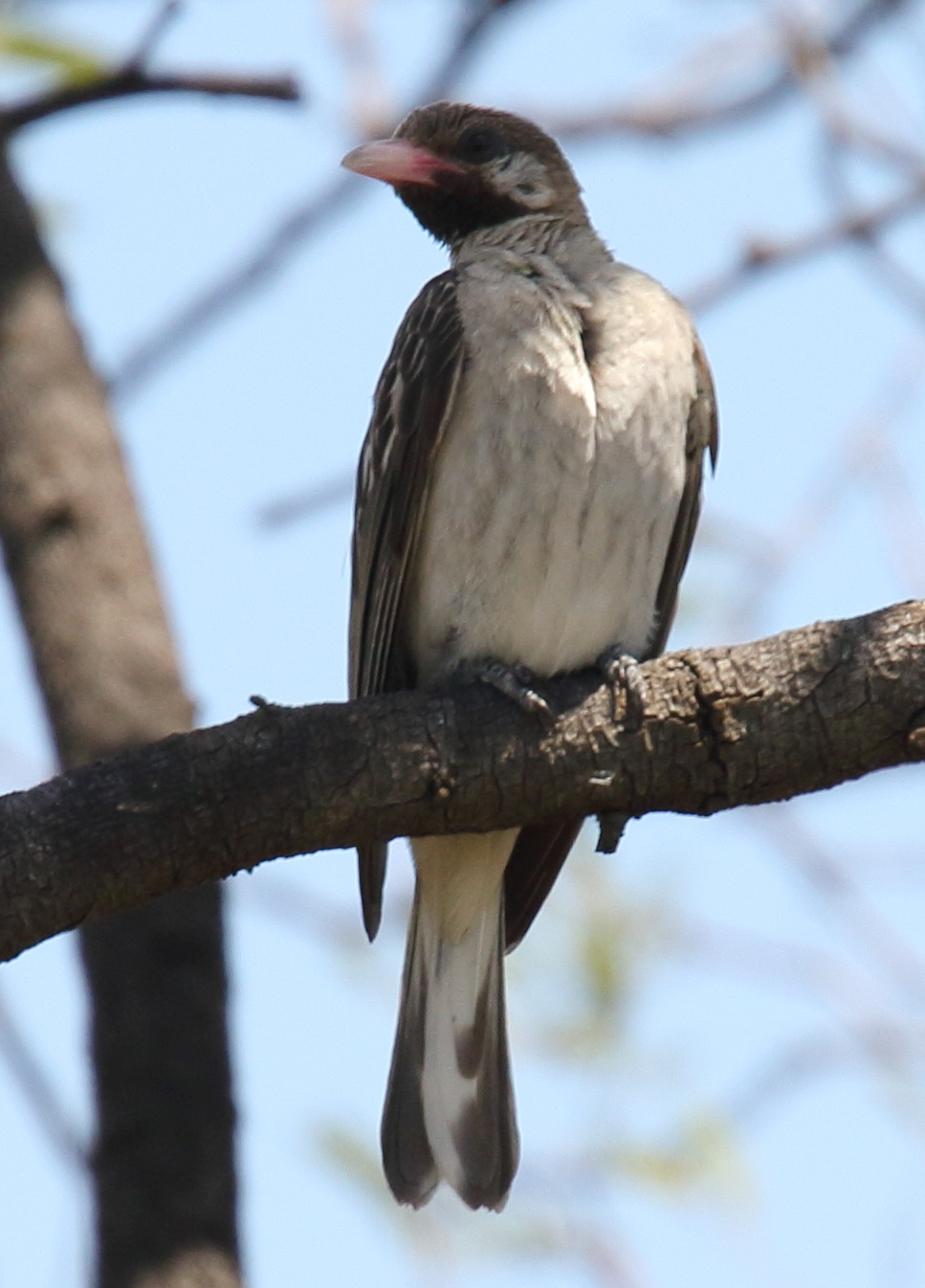
The name of the Indicator indicator refers to its habit of guiding honey badgers and humans to bee colonies, in order to obtain the wax and larvae it feeds on after the honey has been plundered by mammals.

Cooperation is common in non-human animals. Besides cooperation with an immediate benefit for both actors, this behavior appears to occur mostly between relatives. Spending time and resources assisting a related individual may reduce an organism's chances of survival, but because relatives share genes, may increase the likelihood that the helper's genetic traits will be passed on to future generations. The cooperative pulling paradigm is an experimental design used to assess if and under which conditions animals cooperate. It involves two or more animals pulling rewards towards themselves via an apparatus they can not successfully operate alone.

Some researchers assert that cooperation is more complex than this. They maintain that helpers may receive more direct, and less indirect, gains from assisting others than is commonly reported. Furthermore, they insist that cooperation may not solely be an interaction between two individuals but may be part of the broader goal of unifying populations.

== Kin selection ==
One specific form of cooperation in animals is kin selection, which can be defined as animals helping to rear a relative's offspring in order to enhance their own fitness.

Different theories explaining kin selection have been proposed, including the "pay-to-stay" and "territory inheritance" hypotheses. The "pay-to-stay" theory suggests that individuals help others rear offspring in order to return the favor of the breeders allowing them to live on their land. The "territory inheritance" theory contends that individuals help in order to have improved access to breeding areas once the breeders depart. These two hypotheses both appear to be valid, at least in cichlid fish.

Studies conducted on red wolves support previous researchers' contention that helpers obtain both immediate and long-term gains from cooperative breeding. Researchers evaluated the consequences of red wolves' decisions to stay with their packs for extended periods of time after birth. It was found that this "delayed dispersal," while it involved helping other wolves rear their offspring, extended male wolves' life spans. These findings suggest that kin selection may not only benefit an individual in the long-term in terms of increased fitness but in the short-term as well through enhanced chance of survival.

Some research even suggests that certain species provide more help to the individuals with which they are more closely related. This phenomenon is known as kin discrimination. In their meta-analysis, researchers compiled data on kin selection as mediated by genetic relatedness in 18 species, including the Western bluebird, Pied kingfisher, Australian magpie, and Dwarf Mongoose. They found that different species exhibited varying degrees of kin discrimination, with the largest frequencies occurring among those who have the most to gain from cooperative interactions.

== Cooperative systems ==
Cooperation is a process by which the components of a system work together to achieve the global properties. In other words, individual components that appear to be "selfish" and independent work together to create a highly complex, greater-than-the-sum-of-its-parts system. The phenomenon is generally known as 'emergence' and is considered an outcome of self-organization. Examples:

- The components in a cell work together to keep it living.
- Neurons create thought and consciousness, other cells work together and communicate to produce multicellular organisms.
- Organisms form food chains and ecosystems.
- People form families, tribes, cities and nations.
- Atoms cooperate in a simple way, by combining to make up molecules.

Understanding the mechanisms that create cooperating agents in a system is one of the most important and least well understood phenomena in nature, though there has not been a lack of effort.

Individual action on behalf of a larger system may be coerced (forced), voluntary (freely chosen), or even unintentional, and consequently individuals and groups might act in concert even though they have almost nothing in common as regards interests or goals. Examples of that can be found in market trade, military wars, families, workplaces, schools and prisons, and more generally any institution or organization of which individuals are part (out of own choice, by law, or forced).

A cooperative system has been defined in organization studies as a complex of physical, biological, personal and social components which are in a specific systematic relationship by reason of the cooperation of two or more persons for at least one definite end.

== The prisoner's dilemma ==
The prisoner's dilemma is a model that demonstrates how, in certain conditions, members of a group will not cooperate even though cooperation would mutually benefit them all. It makes clear that collective self-interest is insufficient to achieving cooperative behavior, at least when an uncooperative individual who "cheats" can exploit cooperating group members. The prisoner's dilemma formalizing this problem using game theory and has been the subject of much theoretical and experimental research. The first extensive experimental studies were conducted in the early 1960s by Anatol Rapoport and Albert Chammah. Results from experimental economics show that humans often act more cooperatively than strict self-interest, modeled as the Nash Equilibrium, would seem to dictate. While economic experiments require subjects to make relatively abstract decisions for small stakes, evidence from natural experiments for high stakes support the claim that humans act more cooperatively than strict self-interest would dictate.

One reason may be that if the prisoner's dilemma situation is repeated (the iterated prisoner's dilemma), it allows non-cooperation to be punished more, and cooperation to be rewarded more, than the single-shot version of the problem would suggest. It has been suggested that this is one reason for the evolution of complex emotions in higher life forms. Playing the iterated version of the game leads to a cascade of brain signals that relate the speed with which players reciprocate cooperation at subsequent rounds.

In evolutionary biology, five mechanisms for the evolution of cooperation have been suggested: (i) kin selection, (ii) direct reciprocity, (iii) indirect reciprocity, (iv) spatial structure, and (v) group selection.

== See also ==
- Agreeableness
- Collaboration
- Cooperativeness (personality trait)
- Cooperative gameplay
- Dictator game
- Dunbar's number
- Game theory
- Management cybernetics
- Polytely
- Teamwork
- Faz'ah
- Win–win game

=== Books ===
- The Evolution of Cooperation
- Mutual Aid: A Factor of Evolution
