= Aimee Dunlap =

American cognitive ecologist

Aimee Dunlap is a North American cognitive ecologist and associate professor in the Department of Biology at the University of Missouri-St. Louis. She is known for her work on the role of environmental variability in the evolution and ecological function of cognition.

== Life ==
Dunlap began her academic career by receiving her B.S., B.A. in biology, History, & English, at the University of Memphis in 2000. This was followed by a masters in Biological Sciences from Northern Arizona University in 2002 and a PhD in ecology, Evolution and Behavior from the University of Minnesota in 2009.

Her research interests include exploration into experimental evolution of cognition. Specifically, Dunlap focuses on utilizing experimental evolution techniques to directly test hypotheses about how patterns of change and reliability in the environment influence the formation of innate biases and preferences. Aside from this, Dunlap focuses on studying the cognitive differences between various bee populations through predictive models based upon observable natural actions and theories of environmental adaptation. Finally, Dunlap and her lab also research how memory length is an evolutionarily adaptive behavior through studies on bumblebees, blue jays, and pinyon jays.

== Awards ==
In july 2025, she was elected a Fellow of the Animal Behavior Society.

== Research ==
In 2022, she received a $633,000 grant from the National institute of Food and Agriculture to lead a team studying pollination in urban orchards across St.Louis. In 2025 she was the Director of the Whitney R.Harris World Ecology Center.
