= Cognitive ecology =

Branch of ecology studying cognition in social and natural contexts

Cognitive ecology is the study of cognitive phenomena within social and natural contexts. It is an integrative perspective drawing from aspects of anthro-zoology, ecological psychology, cognitive science, evolutionary ecology and anthropology. Notions of domain-specific modules in the brain and the cognitive biases they create are central to understanding the enacted nature of cognition within a cognitive socio-ecological framework. This means that cognitive mechanisms not only shape the characteristics of thought, but they dictate the success of culturally transmitted ideas. i.e. traveling via a 'cultural context'. Because culturally transmitted concepts can often inform socio-ecological decision-making behaviors, in group-level trends to new millennial ecology, can be hypothetical 'cognitively' (i.e., culturally salient concepts) to address socio-ecologically relevant challenges; such as 'what is most sociologically releevant to develop in society.'

== Theoretical basis ==
Cognitive ecology explores the interactive relationship between organism-environment interactions and its impact on cognitive phenomena. Human cognition in this framework is multimodal and viewed similarly to enactivist perspectives on cognitive processing. For cultural concepts, this emphasizes cognitive distribution across an ecosystem, which is predicated on models of the extended mind thesis.

=== Ecological psychology ===
While the multi-faceted nature of cognitive ecology is a consequence of its interdisciplinary history, it primarily derives from early work in ecological psychology. Paradigm shifts from behaviorist orientations of psychology to cognition, or the "cognitive revolution", gave rise to the ecological psychology approach, which distanced itself from mainstream cognitivist views by breaking down the common mind-environment dichotomy of psychological theory.

One particularly influential progenitor of this work was ecological psychologist James Gibson, whose legacy is marked by his ideas on ecological and social affordances. These are the opportunistic features of environmental objects that can be exploited for human use, and are therefore particularly perceptible (e.g., a knob affords twisting, an agreeable social cue affords a warm reaction). Gibson argued further that organisms cannot be disentangled from their environments, and that their cognitive constraints were consequences of a limited set of environmental invariants which shaped them over evolutionary time. An illustrative example for Gibson is the human capacity for three-dimensional visual perception, which he argues is a cognitive concept resulting from the way that people interact with their environment.

Another foreshadowed element of cognitive ecological theory comes from ecological anthropologist Gregory Bateson, who considered the notion of informational feedback loops between mind and environment, particularly their role in generating meaning and awareness of one's surroundings. In an essay, he speculates on how an observer might best delineate the "self" of a blind man. In his treatment, he questions whether one may arbitrarily choose to carve out the man's informational processing loop at his brain or his hands or his walking stick without offering an incomplete view of his cognitive process. This discussion of concept remains influential in modern cognitive ecological considerations of the densely interconnected elements of ecology that play relevant roles in cognition.

=== Enactivism ===
An enactive perspective of cognition is fundamental to a cognitive ecological view. Rather than a passive interpretation of internally represented information, cognition is considered to be an active process involving the transformation of information into meaningful relationships between the organism and its environment. For humans then, a perceived environment is only constructed insofar as cognitive constraints will allow. In other words, they "enact a world" by building perspectives out of ecological information, using their evolved cognitive equipment.

== Extended cognition ==
Cognitive ecology borrows ideas from views of extended cognition, as articulated by Chalmers and Clark (1998). They argue that humans cognitively utilize elements of their environment to aid the cognitive process and further entangle the mind-environment relationship as a result. They illustrate their claim with a hypothetical example of two people who achieve the same navigational success through a museum by different means; a person with Alzheimer's may use a notebook with written directions, while another may use her memory. The primary difference between the two people is that the former outsourced his memory to readily available external representations of information about the museum, whereas the latter relied on internal representations. A variant of this concept they also consider is socially extended cognition, which is a similar outsourcing of cognitive representations into other peoples' minds. These ideas elaborate a cognitive interpretation of broader anthropological notions maintaining that humans are a species deeply entangled in social and material elements of culture.

=== Distributed cognition ===
Distributed cognition is an important model of the extended mind thesis for cognitive ecological theory put forth by Edwin Hutchins. This conceptualizes human groups as active networks with cognitive properties of their own, much like neural networks themselves yield emergent cognitive properties. For a social group, cognitive properties are disseminated into an individual's surrounding network. The cognitive properties of a group, Hutchins notes, is completely distinct from those of an individual. Distributed cognition is fundamentally contingent on and emergent from trending ideas among a collection of brains and artefacts.

This is conceptually similar to models of collective cognition in other social animal groups, which use agent based models to understanding insect swarming, fish schooling, bird flocking and baboon pack behaviors. Collective cognition in social animal groups is adaptive because the group can amplify its overall responsiveness to ecological cues. Likewise, the computational power of a human group can be more effective than that of even its best individuals. This idea is echoed by anthropologists noting the collective intentionality of cultural institutions.

Existing models of cultural learning dynamics seem to articulate the mechanisms by which information is acquired by and distributed within groups. In particular, cultural evolution theorists assert that individual learning is required for tracking environmental dynamics, but this information is retained in culture by social learning. For Hutchins, this theoretical similarity is not a coincidence. After describing distributed cognitive networks and their relationships with ecological dynamics as "cognitive ecosystems", he defines culture as a "shorthand way of referring to a complex cognitive ecosystem."

== Applications to cultural concepts ==
=== Religious beliefs ===
Religious behaviors typically exist in the form of ritual and correspond to religious god concepts. These behaviors are phenotypic outcomes of god concepts that are ultimately subject to natural selection. Cognitive ecologists who study religion predict that god concepts across cultures can be linked to coordination solutions for local socioecological challenges, such as large-scale cooperation, intragroup cohesion and commitment, and resource management. For example, an omniscient and morally punitive "Big God" may be adaptive for large-scale populations by motivating prosocial behavior, whereas gods associated with small-scale societies are often concerned with the stability of local resources.

=== Economic exchange ===
Social contracts and their associated fairness norms are thought by many economists to be contingent on means of production. A hunter-gatherer society, for instance, may operate at an equilibrium where each person contributes to the best of his or her ability and receives according to need. But if this society were to shift toward larger-scale agricultural practices, this equilibrium would be destabilized by increases in free riding and general temptations to profit by defecting. This has been supported empirically in cross-cultural studies using experimental economic game data, which showed a wide range of variance in fairness expectations between populations based on culturally-specific exchange concepts.

This shift in fairness expectations has also been implicated in archaeological data. In particular, the relaxed sharing norms hypothesized to be built upon periods of successful maize exploitation in the pre-Hispanic Pueblo Southwest seemed to be eroded by decreases in agricultural success. In other words, when crops began to fail and supply became low, cultural exchange norms became more stringent, kin-based and based on reciprocity.

== See also ==
- Cognitive ecology of individual recognition in colonial birds
