= Balázs Kovács =

Balázs Kovács may refer to:

- Balázs Kovács (hurdler) (born 1977), Hungarian hurdler
- Balázs Kovács (footballer) (born 1979), Hungarian footballer
- Balázs Kovács (professor), Hungarian-born academic
