= Organizational ecology =

Academic discipline; examines how goal-driven social entities grow, survive and die

Organizational ecology (also organizational demography and the population ecology of organizations) is a theoretical and empirical approach in the social sciences that is considered a sub-field of organizational studies. Organizational ecology utilizes insights from biology, economics, and sociology, and employs statistical analysis to try to understand the conditions under which organizations emerge, grow, and die.

The ecology of organizations is divided into three levels, the community, the population, and the organization. The community level is the functionally integrated system of interacting populations. The population level is the set of organizations engaged in similar activities. The organization level focuses on the individual organizations (some research further divides organizations into individual member and sub-unit levels).

What is generally referred to as organizational ecology in research is more accurately population ecology, focusing on the second level.

== Development ==
Wharton School researcher William Evan called the population level the organization-set, and focused on the interrelations of individual organizations within the population as early as 1966. However, prior to the mid-1970s, the majority of organizational studies research focused on adaptive change in organizations (See also adaptive management and adaptive performance). The ecological approach moved focus to the environmental selection processes that affect organizations.

In 1976, Eric Trist defined population ecology as "the study of the organizational field created by a number of organizations whose interrelations compose a system at the level of the whole field". He also advocated for organizational studies research to focus on populations and individual organizations as part of open rather than closed systems that have both bureaucratic (internal) regulation and ecological (community environment) regulation (see also Open and closed systems in social science).

The first explicit formulation of a theory of population ecology, by Michael T. Hannan and the late John H. Freeman in their 1977 American Journal of Sociology piece "The population ecology of organizations" and later refined in their 1989 book Organizational Ecology, examines the environment in which organizations compete and how a process like natural selection occurs. This theory looks at the death of organizations (firm mortality), the birth of new organizations (organizational founding), as well as organizational growth and change.

Organizational ecology has over the years become one of the central fields in organizational studies, and is known for its empirical, quantitative character. Ecological studies usually have a large-scale, longitudinal focus (datasets often span several decades, sometimes even centuries). The books The Demography of Corporations and Industries by Glenn Carroll and Michael T. Hannan (2000) and Logics of Organization Theory: Audiences, Codes, and Ecologies by Michael T. Hannan, Laszlo Polos, and Glenn Carroll (2007), provide the most comprehensive overview of the various theories and methods in organizational ecology.

== Key concerns ==
Organizational ecology focuses on how social (community) forces affect:

- rates of creation of new organizational forms
- rates of demise of organizations and organizational forms
- the rates of change in organizational forms.

=== Organizational mortality ===
Organizational ecology is concerned with the capacity of the environment to support organizations and the rate of growth and decline of organizations within the environment. Each of these forces is a part of what is called Organizational Mortality.

==== Inertia and change ====
This factor holds that organizations that are reliable and accountable are those that can survive (favored by selection). A negative by-product, however, of the need for reliability and accountability is a high degree of inertia and a resistance to change. A key prediction of organizational ecology is that the process of change itself is so disruptive that it will result in an elevated rate of mortality.

Theories about inertia and change are fundamental to the research program of organizational ecology, which seeks a better understanding of the broader changes in the organizational landscape. Both internal and external resistance to change can result in organizational inertia, providing some resistance to organizational adaptation. Given the limits on firm-level adaptation, most of these broader changes thus come from the entry and selective replacement of organizations. Hence organizational ecology has spent considerable effort on understanding the founding and mortality rates of organizations.

Hannan and Freeman define organizational inertia in terms of internal and external restraints. Internal restraints include investment and sunk costs; availability of information for decision makers; political restraints such as organizational culture; and organization history. External restraints include legal and fiscal barriers to market entry and exit; availability of information about the environment; external legitimacy; and collective rationality and strategy (See also Bounded rationality).

A popular anecdote about organizational inertia recounts a gun crew acting as though they were "holding the horses" although horses were long obsolete.

==== Niche theory ====
Niche width distinguishes broadly between two types of organizations: generalists and specialists. Specialist organizations maximize their exploitation of the environment and accept the risk of experiencing a change in that environment. On the other hand, generalist organizations accept a lower level of exploitation in return for greater security.

Niche theory shows that specialization is generally favored in stable or certain environments. However, the main contribution of the niche theory is probably the finding that "generalism is not always optimal in uncertain environments". The exception is produced by environments which "place very different demands on the organization, and the duration of environmental states is short relative to the life of the organization".

Thus, the niche theory explains variations in industrial structure in different industries. The theory shows how different structures in different industries (generalist vs specialist organizations) are shaped by relevant environments.

==== Density dependence ====
Organizational ecology also predicts that the rates of founding and mortality are dependent on the number of organizations (density) in the market. The two central mechanisms here are legitimization (the recognition or taken-for-grantedness of that group of organizations) and competition. Legitimization generally increases (at a decreasing rate) with the number of organizations, but so does competition (at an increasing rate). The result is that legitimization processes will prevail at low numbers of organizations, while competition will at high numbers.

The founding rate will therefore first increase with the number of organizations (due to an increase in legitimization) but will decrease at high numbers of organizations (due to competition). The reverse holds for mortality rates. Thus, the relationship of density to founding rates has an inverted U shape and the relationship of density to mortality rates follows a U-shaped pattern.

==== Age dependence ====
How an organization's risk of mortality relates to the age of that organization has also been extensively examined. Here, organizational ecologists have found a number of patterns:

- Liability of newness. Here, the risk of failure is high initially but declines as the organization ages.
- Liability of adolescence. The risk of mortality will be low at first as the organization is buffered from failure due to support by external constituents and initial endowments. But when these initial resources become depleted, the mortality hazard shoots up and then declines following the liability of newness pattern.
- Liabilities of aging. Here, the risk of failure increases with organizational age. This could be due to a liability of senescence (internal inefficiencies arising from the aging of the organization) or a liability of obsolescence (a growing external mismatch with the environment).

== Evolutionary approaches to organizations ==
Organizational ecology can be usefully compared with evolutionary theories in economics (e.g. Nelson & Winter, 1982). Hannan and Freeman also note the influences of biological ecology and economic evolution on their population ecology model (specifically Elton, 1927; Durkheim, 1947; Hawley, 1950; and Hutchison, 1959). Main similarities between these strands of literature are: (1) the emphasis on organizational routines and the limits to organizational adaptability, (2) the population or system level of analysis and (3) the importance of environmental selection. Organizational ecology's perspective is more Darwinistic (see Hannan & Freeman, 1989, pp 20–22), while Nelson & Winter (1982, p. 11) provide a more Lamarckian perspective. Another important difference concerns the question: What is selected by the environment-- 'organizational forms', as in organizational ecology, or 'routines' as in the evolutionary economics literature? Authors like Joel Baum and Arjen van Witteloostuijn have argued for the potential of cross-fertilization between these two research strands.

== See also ==
- Adaptive management
- Adaptive performance
- Biocultural evolution
- Bounded rationality
- Open and closed systems in social science
- Organizational behavior
- Organizational behavior management
- Organizational studies
