= The Part Played by Labour in the Transition from Ape to Man =

1876 unfinished essay written by Friedrich Engels

"The Part Played by Labour in the Transition from Ape to Man" (German: "Anteil der Arbeit an der Menschwerdung des Affen") is an unfinished essay written by Friedrich Engels in the spring of 1876 and first published in 1896. The essay forms the ninth chapter of Dialectics of Nature, which proposes a unitary materialist paradigm of natural and human history.

== Summary ==
Though incomplete, the essay elucidates two aspects of materialist theory which had underpinned Marx and Engels's thinking since the mid-1840s. First, it argues that humanity's separation from nature is not inherent to the human condition, but rather that humanity is a part of nature; furthermore, human agency in physically reorganizing nature is part of a long historical process, whereby the physical material of nature is incorporated into human systems of value through labour. Engels uses this framework to suggest that humanity must transcend the ecologically destructive patterns of capitalism, and progress to a mode of production that operates in harmony with nature.

Secondly, the essay confronts the question of cognition and ontology, suggesting that the human brain is not inherently distinct from the brains of other mammals, but that human intellectual capabilities developed through a dialectical relationship with the human body. Specifically, Engels emphasizes the importance of humans’ opposable thumbs and phonetically dynamic mouths, which enabled them to articulate complex forms of language over time. In that respect, the essay challenged the prevailing philosophy of Cartesian dualism, which drew a stark division between mind and body.

Marx and Engels had both alluded to this notion in previous writings, for instance in their first collaborative work, The Holy Family, in which they wrote, "Body, being, substance are but different terms for the same reality. It is impossible to separate thought from matter that thinks." However, in describing this dynamic as a function of the historical process of evolution, the essay is among the most explicit and comprehensive documents on the ontology of Marx and Engels.

== Relevance to Marxist thought ==
The conceptual unity of humanity and nature had been a central theme in Marx and Engels's thought from the early stages of their careers, and was especially prevalent in their discourses on species-being. For instance, in the Economic and Philosophical Manuscripts of 1844, Marx had written, “Man lives from nature, i.e., nature is his body, and he must maintain a continuing dialogue with it if he is not to die. To say that man's physical and mental life is linked to nature simply means that nature is linked to itself, for man is a part of nature.”

However, prior to the publication of Darwin's Origin of Species in 1859 Marx and Engels still lacked a biological grounding for their theory of dialectical materialism. Writing in the Grundrisse in 1858 or shortly before, Marx alluded to the need for a coherent conceptualization of humanity's relationship with the earth: “It is not the unity of living and active humanity with the natural, inorganic conditions of their metabolic exchange with nature, and hence their appropriation of nature, which requires explanation or is the result of a historic process, but rather the separation between these inorganic conditions of human existence and this active existence, a separation which is completely posited only in the relation of wage labour and capital.”

In his attempt to furnish such an explanation, Engels implies that it was the complex thought engendered by manual labour and verbal language that spurred the development of our brains. In a biological sense, humans are not fundamentally different from other mammals, in that most mammals are only physically – and not cognitively – incapable of speech: “The dog and the horse, by association with man, have developed such a good ear for articulate speech that they easily learn to understand any language within their range of concept. Moreover they have acquired the capacity for feelings such as affection for man, gratitude, etc., which were previously foreign to them. Anyone who has had much to do with such animals will hardly be able to escape the conviction that in many cases they now feel their inability to speak as a defect, although, unfortunately, it is one that can no longer be remedied because their vocal organs are too specialized in a definite direction.” He goes on to suggest that parrots can, to a limited extent, comprehend human language – a hypothesis that has been substantiated by scientific studies.

The process of cognitive development described by Engels is today known as gene-culture coevolution or the dual inheritance theory, and is widely accepted among biologists. Stephen Jay Gould has argued that this is the only scientifically sound theory of the evolution of the human brain, and stated that Engels’ essay made “the best nineteenth-century case for gene-culture coevolution.”

== See also ==
- The Origin of the Family, Private Property and the State
- Dialectics of Nature
- Dialectical materialism
- Metabolic rift
- Inheritance of acquired characteristics
- Selective breeding
