= Orgology =

The term "orgology" was coined by Rodolphe Durand, professor of strategy and business policy at HEC Paris, to fill a gap in the study of organizations and management. Economics and sociology are predominant lenses to examine why and how organizations appear and disappear. However, they are laden with underlying assumptions that prevent oftentimes a scrupulous examination of organizations that populate our environment. Economics faces difficulties at embracing the variety of organizations, from clubs, associations, corporations, start-ups and so on and need simplifying principles to predict the functioning of markets. Sociology also has difficulties tackling the variety and complexity of organizations: it either focuses on organizations' inner working or study the formation of markets under the influence of organizations (e.g. contemporary economic sociology).

The term "orgology" is formed by linking 'orgo' for organizations and 'logy' (from logos) and designates a reasoned study of organizations, which aims to study not only the world of organizations, their logics of action, their respective advantages and their internal consistency but also how each of us as individuals build meaning through our relationships with organizations. Drawing on economics, sociology, and organization theory as well as fields such as institutional theory and strategic management, orgology aims to develop a consistent and unique approach of organizations. Orgology emphasizes an intermediary level between macro-concepts ('the' society or 'the' market) and individuals, and approaches organizations as places to construct, administer and exhaust meaning for the world. As such, orgology aims to understand the raison d'être of organizations as providers of solutions, the conditions of their existence and operation, the relationship among organizations and, more generally, the relationship between organizations and the environment.

Orgology is primarily a reasoned analysis of the principles that determine the survival of organizations. It analyzes how organizations choose their resources, allocate and implement them, and how they build universes of meaning. It examines the consequences of these choices and the benefits in terms of legitimacy and competition. In each organization, management fills this allocation function—the practices of assigning resources and roles, implementation and the creation of meaning. Without prejudice towards the goals for which management is implemented, different styles of management can be considered concrete expressions of orgology, located in a specific organization and applied locally. In this respect, orgology allows a distancing and comparison of styles, practices, rituals, myths, functions and effects of management; it leads to the surfacing of alternative managements.

In a nutshell, orgology is thought as the scientific discipline that provides a rational and reasoned analysis of the role of the diverse existing managements, the legitimacy of logics of actions embodied by organizations, the sources of competitive advantage and the sequence of selection criteria critical to the maintenance and survival of organizations. Orgology is therefore also a rationalized and disciplined study of various forms of management that create or destroy meaning in the world experienced by individuals through organizations.

A MOOC based on Durand's latest book has been launched on Coursera on January 13, 2015.
