= Michael T. Hannan =

- Born: July 14, 1943 (age 83)
- Education: College of the Holy Cross (BA); University of North Carolina at Chapel Hill (MA, PhD)
- Scientific career
- Fields: Sociology
- Workplaces: Stanford University; Cornell University; Durham University
- Thesis: Aggregation and Disaggregation in Sociology (1970)

Michael Thomas Hannan (born July 14, 1943) is an American sociologist known for his seminal work in the field of organizational ecology. He is a professor of sociology at Stanford University and the StrataCom Professor of Management at the Stanford Graduate School of Business. He was previously the Scarborough Professor of Social Sciences at Cornell University from 1986 to 1991.

== Biography ==
Hannan graduated from the College of the Holy Cross with a Bachelor of Arts (B.A.) in sociology in 1965. He pursued graduate studies in sociology at the University of North Carolina at Chapel Hill, earning a Master of Arts (M.A.) and Ph.D. in sociology in 1968 and 1970, respectively. His doctoral dissertation concerned levels of analysis and was republished in 1971 as "Aggregation and Disaggregation in Sociology".

Hannan started his academic career as assistant professor of sociology at Stanford University, where he got promoted to professor of sociology. In 1984 he moved to Cornell University, where he was appointed professor of social sciences. In 1991 he moved back to Stanford to become professor of management and professor of sociology, and since 2015 emeritus.

Among others he was awarded a Guggenheim Fellowships in sociology in 1987, and a Max Weber Award by the American Sociological Association in 1992 and 2002.

== Work ==
=== Organizational ecology ===
Hannan and John H. Freeman were the first to formulate an explicit organizational theory about population ecology with the 1977 article in the American Journal of Sociology, which was the seminal work in the field of organizational ecology. This article proposed:

... [a] population ecology perspective on organization-environment relations... as an alternative to the dominant adaptation perspective. The strength of inertial pressures on organizational structure suggests the application of models that depend on competition and selection in populations of organizations. Several such models, as well as issues arising in attempts to apply them to the organization-environment problem, are discussed.

The scope of their organizational ecology theory ranged from birth of new organizations (organizational founding), organizational growth and organizational change, to the death of organizations (firm mortality). Organizations compete in their environment, where processes like natural selection rule.

=== The role of categories ===
Since the early 2000s, Hannan has been researching how concepts and categories shape markets. His main contribution is introducing fuzzy concepts to the study of industry and population boundaries. With his co-authors, Gael Le Mens, Greta Hsu, Balázs Kovács, Giacomo Negro, László Pólos, Elizabeth Pontikes, and Amanda Sharkey, they published a book on this topic: Concepts and Categories: Foundations for Sociological and Cultural Analysis.

== Selected publications ==
- Hannan, Michael T., and Glenn R. Carroll. Dynamics of organizational populations: Density, legitimation, and competition. Oxford University Press, 1992.
- Hannan, Michael T., and John H. Freeman. Organizational ecology. Harvard University Press, 1993.
- Hannan, Michael T., Gael Le Mens, Greta Hsu, Balázs Kovács, Giacomo Negro, László Pólos, Elizabeth Pontikes, and Amanda Sharkey Concepts and Categories: Foundations for Sociological and Cultural Analysis. Columbia University Press, 2019.

Articles, a selection

- Hannan, Michael T., and John H. Freeman. The population ecology of organizations. American journal of sociology 82.5 (1977): 929–964.
- Hannan, Michael T., and John H. Freeman. Structural inertia and organizational change. American sociological review (1984): 149–164.

== Awards and honors ==
- Fellow, American Academy of Arts and Sciences, 1991
- Max Weber Award, American Sociological Association, 2002
- Max Weber Award, American Sociological Association, 1991
- Distinguished Scholar, Organization Theory and Management Division, Academy of Management, 1991
- Best Paper Award in Mathematical Sociology, American Sociological Association, 2003
- Theorodology Prize, Princeton Sociology Department, 2014
