= Cultural group selection =

Model of cultural evolution

Cultural group selection is an explanatory model within cultural evolution of how cultural traits evolve according to the competitive advantage they bestow upon a group. This multidisciplinary approach to the question of human culture engages research from the fields of anthropology, behavioural economics, evolutionary biology, evolutionary game theory, sociology, and psychology.

While cultural norms are often beneficial to the individuals who hold them, they need not be. Norms can spread by cultural group selection when they are practiced within successful groups, and norms are more likely to spread from groups that are successful. But, for cultural group selection to occur, there must exist, between groups, cultural differences that when transmitted across time affect the persistence or proliferation of the groups. Cultural norms that provide these advantages will, in turn, lead to the displacement, absorption or even extinction of other, less successful cultural groups. However, game theoretic models suggest that if individuals are able to migrate between groups (which is common in small-scale societies), differences between groups should be difficult to maintain. Research in psychology reveals that humans have a particular set of traits, which include imitation, conformity, and in-group bias, that are capable of supporting the maintenance of these group differences over extended periods of time.

Cultural group selection gives a compelling explanation for how large-scale complex societies have formed. While altruistic behaviour such as kin selection and reciprocity can explain the behaviour of small social groups common in many species, it is unable to explain the large complex societies of unrelated, anonymous individuals that we see in the human species. However, one of the major distinctions between humans and other species is our reliance on social learning in acquiring behaviours. These instincts allow for the acquisition and persistence of culture. Through cultural group selection, culturally specific cooperative behaviour can evolve to support large societies. For example, in a study that spanned a variety of cultures, testing behaviour in Ultimatum, Dictator, and Third-party punishment games, it was found that standards of fairness and inclination to punish were correlated with both participation in world religions and market integration. This indicates how many of the behaviours necessary for complex societies are the result of cultural exposure rather than any evolution of our psychology.

== Human adaptations for culture ==
For cultural knowledge and behaviour to persist across multiple generations, humans need to have the capacity to acquire, retain, and transmit cultural information. While many species engage in social learning, humans consistently rely upon it for behavioural cues and information about the environment. In a study comparing human children and young chimpanzees, it was shown that, when given a demonstration on how to retrieve a reward from a box, chimps copy relevant behaviour, while ignoring irrelevant behaviour, to solve the task. Meanwhile, human children will faithfully imitate both relevant and irrelevant behaviour to solve the same task. While this may seem like a negative quality, it is what allows for reliable, high-fidelity transmission of cultural information, and produces stable behavioural equilibria within cultural groups.

Michael Tomasello suggests the following three adaptations are necessary for human culture:

=== Joint attention ===
At around 9–12 months infants begin engaging in joint attention. This involves following the gaze of an adult or using them as social reference points. Put simply, they become aware of the adult's attention and behaviour towards objects in the environment. In this sense, the child is beginning to understand people as goal-oriented intentional agents. This is vitally important for learning through imitation and, eventually, language acquisition.

=== Imitative learning ===
By about 1 year of age, children begin to learn by imitation. At this point, children are capable of discriminating intentional actions from unintentional ones, and will attempt to accurately copy those intentional actions to accomplish tasks they've seen adults do. Because of imitative learning, children will copy those intentional acts which have no perceivable effect on the outcome, as well as strange or unnatural actions when easier methods are available. For example, an Andrew Meltzoff study found that 14-month-old children will, after seeing an adult do it, bend at the waist and press a panel with their head to turn on a light, instead of using their hands. According to Tomasello, imitative learning is necessary for learning the symbolic conventions of language.

=== Linguistic symbols and cognitive representation ===
Through imitatively learning, the child comprehends that linguistic symbols are intended to focus attention to some specific aspect of the shared experience. In doing this, the child must be able to take the perspective of the speaker. Due to the intersubjectivity of linguistic symbols, language allows one to communicate various perspectives and shift attention to one aspect of the world over another. In learning a language, a child is inheriting a vast set of linguistic symbols that have been passed down many generations. What is inherited then is the methods of shifting attention and perspective that were historically of importance to the people of that culture.

== Mechanisms that maintain between-group variation ==
Without between-group variation, cultural group selection could not occur, as there would be no group differentiation to select for. While processes such as cultural drift, epidemics, and natural disasters increase between-group variation, migration and genetic mixing decrease between-group variation and increase within-group variation. Variation is only maintained when cultural groups have mechanisms that prevent the norms of outside groups from invading the cultural group. These ‘mechanisms’ are those uniquely human psychological traits and behaviours that encourage imitation, conformity, and in-group biases.

According to Joseph Henrich, between-group variation is maintained by the following four mechanisms:

=== Conformist transmission ===
Conformist transmission refers to the psychological bias to preferentially imitate high frequency behaviors in the cultural group. This homogenizes the social group and reinforces widely held cultural norms. This explains why individuals within a social group hold the same beliefs and why these beliefs persist over time. While individuals will rely on copying high frequency behaviors under various conditions, this reliance increases when an individual is exposed to ambiguous environmental or social information. Conformist transmission can maintain between-group variation by reducing within-group variation, but it also facilitates the rapid spread of novel ideas, which increases between-group variation. Taken together, reduced within-group variation and increased between-group variation lead to the cultural divergence between groups that is the driving force of cultural group selection.

=== Prestige-biased and self-similarity transmission ===
Prestige-biased transmission is the tendency to copy those members of the group that are more successful. Preferentially copying successful members of the group allows individuals to avoid costly trial-and-error learning by imitating the better-than-average skills of the more prestigious cultural models. Individual can determine the rank of potential models by how much deference they are shown by the rest of the group. Deference is shown to high-prestige individuals to gain the opportunity to copy their successful models. We can see evidence for this bias in how new technologies, or economic practices spread to different groups according to how quick "opinion leaders" adopt them.

Meanwhile, self-similarity transmission is the tendency to copy those individuals who are similar in language, appearance, social standing and other behavioral and cultural traits. In the context of prestige-biased transmission, self-similarity means that individuals will preferentially imitate those high-prestige individuals who are similar to them. From the perspective of an imitator, this trait is adaptive. By only imitating those high-prestige individuals who are similar, the imitator avoids adopting traits or behaviors that are not compatible with his or her knowledge or social environment.

These two social biases act together in reducing within-group variation. Additionally, prestige-biased transmission increases between-group variation by contributing to the spread of novel ideas.

=== Punishment of non-conformists ===
Non-conformists threaten to increase within-group variation by introducing deviant behaviours to the group and must receive costly punishment to maintain a homogenous social group. As a consequence of being punished, non-conformists will be less successful than other members of the group. Prestige-biased transmission would suggest that non-conformist behaviors would, therefore, not spread through the population. Papers on the topic suggest that this kind of punishment is prevalent across many different societies.

=== Normative conformity ===
Normative conformity is the act of changing one's visible behaviour, simply to appear to match the majority, and without actually internalizing the groups opinions. This differs from conformist transmission since normative conformity does not consider frequency of a behaviour as an indicator of worth. The Asch conformity experiments are a perfect example of how robust this effect is and its replication across many cultures shows that this behaviour is very common. Henrich suggests that normative conformity may have evolved to respond to the spread of punishing behaviour toward non-conformists. By appearing similar to the group, one can gain the advantages of in-group membership, while also avoiding punishment. A curious byproduct of normative conformity is that it can contribute to the conformity transmission of norms that the transmitter does not hold, because they were mistakenly attributed by the imitator.

== Mechanisms ==
As Donald T. Campbell says, for cultural group selection to occur, there must be cultural differences between groups which affect their persistence or proliferation. This means groups are selected for or against according to their respective gains or losses relative to other groups.

Joseph Henrich describes the three mechanisms through which this process occurs:

=== Demographic swamping ===
Demographic swamping occurs when one or more cultural groups reproduces individuals faster than other groups in the region because of stable, culturally transmitted ideas or practices. This is the slowest kind of cultural groups selection as it depends on natural selection of between-group cultural variation operating on a scale of millennia. It has been suggested that this is how early agriculturalist displaced hunter-gatherer societies.

=== Direct intergroup competition ===
Direct intergroup competition is the process by which cultural groups compete with each other over resources by engaging in warfare and raiding. The cultural practices and behaviour that gives an advantage to one group over another will proliferate at the expense of those who cannot compete. There are many possible traits that could contribute to a group's success, such as technological development, social and political organization, economic development, nationalism, etc. According to Joseph Soltis, it would take 500–1000 years for group selection to happen this way.

=== Prestige-biased group selection ===
In prestige-biased group selection, when individuals have opportunities to copy people from nearby groups, they will preferentially imitate the members of groups that are more cooperative than their own. Since cooperative groups have a higher average payoff than non-cooperative groups, members of cooperative groups will be considered more prestigious and worthy of imitation.

== Testing the theory ==
Cultural group selection theory can provide insight into human cooperation and is therefore a useful framework for generating hypothesis related to cultural evolution. These theories, however, must be tested using empirical data: a task addressed by several large-scale projects in the field of quantitative history. For instance, the Seshat: Global History Databank uses real-world historical, archaeological and anthropological data to test hypotheses from cultural group selection theory and other competing explanations. The Collaborative for Information and Analysis; the International Institute of Social History; and the Database of Religious History also provide datasets and analytical tools for assessing the validity of competing hypotheses about human cultural evolution.

== See also ==
- Dual inheritance theory – Theory of human behavior
- Evolutionary game theory – Application of game theory to evolving populations in biology
- Group selection – Proposed mechanism of evolution
- Memetics – Study of self-replicating units of culture
