= Gillian Ruth Brown =

British psychologist

Gillian Ruth Brown is a British psychologist and reader in Psychology and Neuroscience at the University of St Andrews. She is known for her research on the evolutionary approaches to the study of human behavior. Brown held a Wellcome Trust Career Development Fellowship from 2006 to 2010.

== Bibliography ==
- Sense and nonsense: Evolutionary perspectives on human behaviour, Oxford University Press, 2002, Kevin N. Laland and Gillian R. Brown, 1st edition ISBN 9780198508847
- Sense and nonsense: Evolutionary perspectives on human behaviour, Oxford University Press, 2011, Kevin N. Laland and Gillian R. Brown, 2nd edition ISBN 9780199586967
- Sense and nonsense: Evolutionary perspectives on human behaviour, Oxford University Press, 2024, Kevin N. Lala and Gillian R. Brown, 3rd edition ISBN 9780198908203

== See also ==
- Dual inheritance theory
