= Organizational field =

Organizational field is defined as "sets of organizations that, in the aggregate, constitute a recognized area of institutional life; key suppliers, resource and product consumers, regulatory agencies, and other organizations that produce similar services or products".

== See also ==
- Business cluster
