= Balázs Kovács (professor) =

Social scientist

- Born: Balázs Kovács; Hungary
- Education: Corvinus University; Stanford Graduate School of Business
- Occupation: Academic

Balázs Kovács is a Hungarian-born academic. He is a management professor at the Yale School of Management.

== Early life and education ==
Born in Hungary, Kovács received a diploma in economics and sociology from Corvinus University in Budapest, Hungary, in 2004. He also attended the University of Groningen in the Netherlands from 2002 to 2003. Later, he moved to the United States and earned a M.A. in sociology and PhD in business administration from the Stanford Graduate School of Business in 2009.

== Career ==
After receiving his PhD from Stanford University, Kovács joined the University of Lugano in Switzerland as an Assistant Professor of Organizations and Markets in 2009 and served in this role until 2015.

From 2015 to 2020, Kovács was an Assistant Professor of Organizational Behavior at Yale, later becoming an Associate Professor from 2020 to 2023.

As of 2023, Kovács serves as Professor of Organizational Behavior with an additional courtesy appointment in Sociology. He is also affiliated with the Yale Institute for Network Science and the Computation and Society Initiative at Yale.

== Research ==
Kovács' research investigates the impact of social structures, such as categories, awards, online reviews, and social networks, on perceptions within creative domains such as music and literature. This exploration considers how quality and relevance are constructed through social evaluations and categorization, focusing on the relationships and interactions of various audience segments and networks. His methodologies often involve analyzing large datasets, specifically online reviews and social connections.

Kovács has contributed to various academic journals, including Administrative Science Quarterly, American Sociological Review, and Strategic Management Journal.

With his co-authors, Michael T. Hannan, Gael Le Mens, Greta Hsu, Giacomo Negro, László Pólos, Elizabeth Pontikes, and Amanda Sharkey created a novel theoretical approach on an understanding of how people use basic concepts in their everyday lives to give meaning to objects, other people, and social situations and actions.

In recent work, he shows the implications of GenAI and ChatGPT on categorization processes.

== Bibliography ==
=== Books ===
- Hannan, Michael T.; Le Mens, Gaël; Hsu, Greta; Kovács, Balázs; Negro, Giacomo; Pólos, László; Pontikes, Elizabeth G.; Sharkey, Amanda J. (2019). Concepts and Categories: Foundations for Sociological and Cultural Analysis. Columbia University Press. ISBN 978-0-231-54993-6.

== Selected publications ==
- Authenticity and consumer value ratings: Empirical tests from the restaurant domain. B Kovács, GR Carroll, DW Lehman. Organization Science. 2013
- Authenticity. DW Lehman, K O’Connor, B Kovács, GE Newman. Academy of Management Annals 13 (1), 1-42. 2019
- The paradox of publicity: How awards can negatively affect the evaluation of quality. B Kovács, AJ Sharkey. Administrative science quarterly 59 (1), 1-33. 2014
- What does it mean to span cultural boundaries? Variety and atypicality in cultural consumption. A Goldberg, MT Hannan, B Kovács. American Sociological Review 81 (2), 215-241. 2016
- The consequences of category spanning depend on contrast. B Kovács, MT Hannan. Categories in markets: Origins and evolution 31, 175-201. 2010
- Conceptual spaces and the consequences of category spanning. B Kovács, MT Hannan. Sociological science 2, 252-286. 2015
- Social networks and loneliness during the COVID-19 pandemic. B Kovacs, N Caplan, S Grob, M King. Socius 7, 2378023120985254. 2021
- Selective sampling of empirical settings in organizational studies. J Denrell, B Kovács. Administrative Science Quarterly 53 (1), 109-144. 2008
- Gender differences in obtaining and maintaining patent rights. K Jensen, B Kovács, O Sorenson. Nature biotechnology 36 (4), 307-309. 2018
- Concepts and categories: Foundations for sociological and cultural analysis. Hannan, M T, G Le Mens, B Kovács, G Negro, L Pólos, E Pontikes, AJ Sharkey. Columbia University Press. 2019
