= Cultural evolution =

Evolutionary theory of social change

Cultural evolution

Cultural evolution is an evolutionary theory of social change. It follows from the definition of culture as the "information capable of affecting individuals' behavior that they acquire from other members of their species through teaching, imitation and other forms of social transmission". Cultural evolution is the change of this information over time. This theoretical framework uses concepts like cultural variants, transmission mechanisms, and selective pressures to model how ideas, behaviors, and technologies spread and change over time, enabling rapid adaptation beyond purely genetic means.

Anthropologists originally developed the idea of cultural evolution, historically also known as sociocultural evolution, in the 19th century, stemming from Charles Darwin's research on evolution. Today, cultural evolution has become the basis for a growing field of scientific research in the social sciences, including anthropology, economics, psychology, and organizational studies. Previously, theorists believed that social change resulted from biological adaptations. However, anthropologists now commonly accept that social changes arise from a combination of social, environmental, and biological influences, as viewed from a nature vs nurture framework.

Joseph Henrich credits cultural evolution with vast and sweeping influence:

For over a million years, the products of cumulative cultural evolution — our complex technologies, languages, and institutions — have driven our genetic evolution, shaping not only our digestive systems, teeth, feet, and shoulders but also our brains and psychology.

There have been a number of different approaches to the study of cultural evolution, including dual inheritance theory, sociocultural evolution, memetics, and other variants on cultural selection theory. The approaches differ not just in the history of their development and discipline of origin but in how they conceptualize the process of cultural evolution and the assumptions, theories, and methods that they apply to its study. There has been a convergence of the cluster of related theories towards seeing cultural evolution as a unified discipline in its own right. The evolutionary origins of human cultural evolution remain debated, including when cumulative forms of culture first emerged in the hominin lineage and how early archaeological evidence should be interpreted. The evolution of the human capacity for cultural evolution is therefore a distinct research question that can be investigated through archaeology together with comparative approaches to humans and other primates.

== History ==
Aristotle thought that development of cultural form (such as poetry) stops when it reaches its maturity. James Gleick quotes a 1873 essay in Harper's New Monthly Magazine: "By the principle which Darwin describes as natural selection short words are gaining the advantage over long words, direct forms of expression are gaining the advantage over indirect, words of precise meaning the advantage of the ambiguous, and local idioms are everywhere in disadvantage."

Cultural evolution, in the Darwinian sense of variation and selective inheritance, could be said to trace back to Darwin himself. Darwin argued for both customs (1874 p. 239) and "inherited habits" as contributing to human evolution, grounding both in the innate capacity for acquiring language.

Darwin's ideas, along with those of such as Comte (1798-1857) and Quetelet (1796-1874), influenced a number of what would now be called social scientists in the late-nineteenth and early-twentieth centuries. Hodgson and Knudsen single out David George Ritchie (1853-1903) and Thorstein Veblen (1857-1929), crediting the former with anticipating both dual inheritance theory and universal Darwinism. Despite the stereotypical image of social Darwinism that developed later in the century, neither Ritchie nor Veblen were on the political right.

The early years of the 20th century and particularly the period of World War I (1914 to 1918) saw biological concepts and metaphors shunned by most social sciences. Even uttering the word evolution carried "serious risk to one's intellectual reputation". Darwinian ideas were also in decline following the rediscovery of Mendelian genetics, but figures such as Fisher, Haldane, and Wright revived them, developing the first population genetic models and (as it became known) the "modern synthesis".

Cultural evolutionary concepts, or even metaphors, revived more slowly. If there were one influential individual in the revival it was probably Donald T. Campbell. In 1960 he drew on Wright to draw a parallel between genetic evolution and the "blind variation and selective retention" of creative ideas; work that developed into a full theory of "socio-cultural evolution" in 1965 (a work that includes references to other works in the then current revival of interest in the field). Campbell (1965 26) was clear that he perceived cultural evolution not as an analogy "from organic evolution per se, but rather from a general model for quasiteleological processes for which organic evolution is but one instance".

Others pursued more specific analogies notably the anthropologist F. T. (Ted) Cloak who argued in 1975 for the existence of learnt cultural instructions (cultural corpuscles or i-culture) resulting in material artefacts (m-culture) such as wheels. The argument thereby introduced as to whether cultural evolution requires neurological instructions continues to the present day.

=== Unilinear theory ===
In the 19th century cultural evolution was thought to follow a unilineal pattern whereby all cultures progressively develop over time. The underlying assumption was that Cultural Evolution itself led to the growth and development of civilization.

Thomas Hobbes in the 17th century declared indigenous culture to have "no arts, no letters, no society" and he described facing life as "solitary, poor, nasty, brutish, and short." He, like other scholars of his time, reasoned that everything positive and esteemed resulted from the slow development away from this poor lowly state of being.

Under the theory of unilinear Cultural Evolution, all societies and cultures develop on the same path. The first to present a general unilineal theory was Herbert Spencer. Spencer suggested that humans develop into more complex beings as culture progresses, where people originally lived in "undifferentiated hordes" culture progresses and develops to the point where civilization develops hierarchies. The concept behind unilinear theory is that the steady accumulation of knowledge and culture leads to the separation of the various modern day sciences and the build-up of cultural norms present in modern-day society.

In Lewis H. Morgan's book Ancient Society (1877), Morgan labels seven differing stages of human culture: lower, middle, and upper savagery; lower, middle, and upper barbarism; and civilization. He justifies this staging classification by referencing societies whose cultural traits resembled those of each of his stage classifications of the cultural progression. Morgan gave no example of lower savagery, as even at the time of writing few examples remained of this cultural type. At the time of expounding his theory, Morgan's work was highly respected and became a foundation for much of anthropological study that was to follow.

==== Cultural particularism ====
There began a widespread condemnation of unilinear theory in the late 19th century. Unilinear cultural evolution implicitly assumes that culture was borne out of the United States and Western Europe. That was seen by many to be racist, as it assumed that some individuals and cultures were more evolved than others.

Franz Boas, a German-born anthropologist, was the instigator of the movement known as 'cultural particularism' in which the emphasis shifted to a multilinear approach to cultural evolution. That differed to the unilinear approach that used to be favoured in the sense that cultures were no longer compared, but they were assessed uniquely. Boas, along with several of his pupils, notably A.L. Kroeber, Ruth Benedict and Margaret Mead, changed the focus of anthropological research to the effect that instead of generalizing cultures, the attention was now on collecting empirical evidence of how individual cultures change and develop.

==== Multilinear theory ====
Cultural particularism dominated popular thought for the first half of the 20th century before American anthropologists, including Leslie A. White, Julian H. Steward, Marshall D. Sahlins, and Elman R. Service, revived the debate on cultural evolution. These theorists were the first to introduce the idea of multilinear cultural evolution.

Under multilinear theory, there are no fixed stages (as in unilinear theory) towards cultural development. Instead, there are several stages of differing lengths and forms. Although, individual cultures develop differently and cultural evolution occurs differently, multilinear theory acknowledges that cultures and societies do tend to develop and move forward.

Leslie A. White focused on the idea that different cultures had differing amounts of 'energy', White argued that with greater energy societies could possess greater levels of social differentiation. He rejected separation of modern societies from primitive societies. In contrast, Steward argued, much like Darwin's theory of evolution, that culture adapts to its surroundings. 'Evolution and Culture' by Sahlins and Service is an attempt to condense the views of White and Steward into a universal theory of multilinear evolution.

Robert Wright recognized the inevitable development of cultures. He proposed that population growth was a crucial component of cultural evolution. Population has a symbiotic relationship with technological, economic, and political development.

=== Memetics ===
Richard Dawkins' 1976 book The Selfish Gene proposed the concept of the "meme", which is analogous to that of the gene. A meme is an idea-replicator that can reproduce itself, by jumping from mind to mind via the process of one human learning from another via imitation. Along with the "virus of the mind" image, the meme might be thought of as a "unit of culture" (an idea, belief, pattern of behaviour, etc.), which spreads among the individuals of a population. The variation and selection in the copying process enables Darwinian evolution among memeplexes and therefore is a candidate for a mechanism of cultural evolution. As memes are "selfish" in that they are "interested" only in their own success, they could well be in conflict with their biological host's genetic interests. Consequently, a "meme's eye" view might account for certain evolved cultural traits, such as suicide terrorism, that are successful at spreading the meme of martyrdom, but fatal to their hosts and often other people.

=== Evolutionary epistemology ===
"Evolutionary epistemology" can also refer to a theory that applies the concepts of biological evolution to the growth of human knowledge and argues that units of knowledge themselves, particularly scientific theories, evolve according to selection. In that case, a theory, like the germ theory of disease, becomes more or less credible according to changes in the body of knowledge surrounding it.

One of the hallmarks of evolutionary epistemology is the notion that empirical testing alone does not justify the pragmatic value of scientific theories but rather that social and methodological processes select those theories with the closest "fit" to a given problem. The mere fact that a theory has survived the most rigorous empirical tests available does not, in the calculus of probability, predict its ability to survive future testing. Karl Popper used Newtonian physics as an example of a body of theories so thoroughly confirmed by testing as to be considered unassailable, but they were nevertheless improved on by Albert Einstein's bold insights into the nature of space-time. For the evolutionary epistemologist, all theories are true only provisionally, regardless of the degree of empirical testing they have survived.

Many consider that Popper gave evolutionary epistemology its first comprehensive treatment, but Donald T. Campbell had coined the phrase in 1974.

=== Dual inheritance theory ===
Dual inheritance theory (DIT), also known as gene–culture coevolution or biocultural evolution, developed in the 1960s through early 1980s to explain human behavior as a product of two different and interacting evolutionary processes: genetic evolution and cultural evolution. Genes and culture (DIT suggests) continually interact in a feedback loop: changes in genes can lead to changes in culture which can then influence genetic selection, and vice versa. One of the theory's central claims is that culture evolves partly through a Darwinian selection process, which dual-inheritance theorists often describe by analogy to genetic evolution.

== Criticism and controversy ==
As a relatively new and growing scientific field, cultural evolution is undergoing much formative debate. Some of the prominent conversations are revolving around universal Darwinism, dual inheritance theory, and memetics.

Cultural evolution has drawn conversations from multi-disciplinary sources with movement towards a unified view between the natural and social sciences. There remains some accusation of biological reductionism, as opposed to cultural naturalism, and scientific efforts are often mistakenly associated with Social Darwinism. However, some useful parallels between biological and social evolution still appear to be found.

Researchers Alberto Acerbi and Alex Mesoudi's criticism of Cultural Evolution lies in the ambiguity surrounding the analogy between cultural and genetic evolution. They clarify the distinction between cultural selection (high-fidelity replication of traits) and cultural attraction (reconstruction of traits with lower fidelity). They argue that both mechanisms coexist in cultural evolution, making it essential to empirically determine their prevalence in different contexts, addressing confusion in the field.

=== Criticism of historic approaches to cultural evolution ===
Cultural evolution has been criticized over the past two centuries that it has advanced its development into the form it holds today. Morgan's theory of evolution implies that all cultures follow the same basic pattern. Human culture is not linear, different cultures develop in different directions and at differing paces, and it is not satisfactory or productive to assume cultures develop in the same way.

A further key critique of cultural evolutionism is what is known as "armchair anthropology". The name results from the fact that many of the anthropologists advancing theories had not seen first hand the cultures they were studying. The research and data collected was carried out by explorers and missionaries as opposed to the anthropologists themselves. Edward Tylor was the epitome of that and did very little of his own research. Cultural evolution is also criticized for being ethnocentric; cultures are still seen as attempting to emulate western civilization. Under ethnocentricity, primitive societies are said to not yet be at the cultural levels of other Western societies.

Much of the criticism aimed at cultural evolution is focused on the unilinear approach to social change. Broadly speaking in the second half of the 20th century the criticisms of cultural evolution have been answered by the multilinear theory. Ethnocentricity, for example, is more prevalent under the unilinear theory.

Some approaches, such as dual inheritance theory, make use of empirical methods including psychological and animal studies, field site research, and computational models.

== Machine culture ==
With the advent of increasingly pervasive and capable artificial intelligence, Brinkmann et al. (2023) argue that intelligent machines will increasingly shape cultural evolution by impacting the key Darwinian properties of culture (variation, transmission, and selection).

== See also ==
- Behavioral ecology – Study of the evolutionary basis for animal behavior due to ecological pressures
- Cliodynamics – Mathematical modeling of historical processes
- Cognitive ecology – Branch of ecology studying cognition in social and natural contexts
- Cultural group selection – Model of cultural evolution
- Environmental determinism – Theory that a society's development is predetermined by its physical environment
- Spatial ecology – Study of the distribution or space occupied by species

== Notes ==
=== Words cited ===
- Darwin, C. R. (1871), The Descent of Man and Selection in Relation to Sex, John Murray
