= Cognitive ecology of individual recognition in colonial birds =

The cognitive ecology of individual recognition has been studied in many species, especially in primates or other mammalian species that exhibit complex social behaviours, but comparatively little research has been done on colonial birds. Colonial birds live in dense colonies in which many individuals interact with each other daily. For colonial birds, being able to identify and recognize individuals can be a crucial skill.

== Sociality and brain size ==
Individual recognition is one of the most basic forms of social cognition. If we were to define individual recognition, it would imply that a given individual has the capacity to discriminate a familiar individual from another one at any given time. It is believed that in many species, group size is often a representation of social complexity, with higher social complexity demanding higher cognitive capabilities. This hypothesis is also known as the "social brain hypothesis" and has been supported by many researchers. The logic behind this hypothesis is based on the principle that larger group size will require a higher degree of complexity in their interactions. Many studies have looked at the effect of sociality on the brain development, mostly focussing on non-human primate species. In primates, it has been shown that relative brain size, when controlling for the size of the species and the phylogeny, seemed to correlate with the size of the social group. These results allowed for a direct correlation between sociality and cognition. However, when reproducing such experiments in non-primate species, like with reptiles, birds and even other mammalian species, the correlation between brain size and social group size does not seems to exist. A study done on mountain chickadees looking at the impact of sociality on the hippocampus size as well as on neurogenesis found no evidence of change related to group size, therefore rejecting the "social brain hypothesis" in birds. Further research looking at bird cognitive ecology demonstrated that social complexity is a more reliable proxy for brain size, as it relies not only on the number of individuals but also on the degree of social interactions and more.

=== Role of recognition ===
In the wild, recognition can have many advantages. When looking at monogamous birds species, being able to recognize your mate can be crucial. As colonial birds tend to cluster in high density groups, finding your mate can be a challenge. Being able to identify your mate is not all, recognition can also help in the context of mate selection as individual recognition allows birds to avoid inbreeding with conspecifics. Inbreeding avoidance has been shown in a species of storm petrel, a colonial seabird that nests in burrows. In the case of storm petrels, individual relatedness is assessed based on olfactory signatures that allow them to distinguish closely related individuals from non-related ones. The capacity of an individual to identify conspecifics is not only used to avoid inbreeding, but can also be used in order to help closely related individuals. Such instances can be seen in scrub jays, whose offspring stay after fledging in order to help raise the next brood.

Moreover, recognition can be useful for chick identification. Being able to recognize your own chick is essential in many colonial bird species as chicks can wander around and mix up with others' chicks. Feeding the wrong chick would result in high cost for the parent with little to no benefit for their own reproductive success. In herring gulls, chicks can be found wandering around the colony only a few days after hatching from the egg, creating a need for the parent to recognize its own chick. However, in order to have evolved, recognition needs to be beneficial not only for one side, but for both sides, meaning that the chick has to be able to recognize its parents as well. Still looking at herring gulls, chicks will often hide when the parents are not present in order to avoid being predated on by other adult herring gulls or any other predator. Therefore, being able to recognize your parent is crucial in order to reveal your position to the right adult. In the case of bird species that raise many offspring at once, chicks that are able to recognize their parents may also increase their begging rate and therefore obtain more food in return. Chicks that have better recognition capacities would therefore have the advantage over their siblings.

== Mechanism of recognition in colonial birds ==
=== Olfactory recognition ===
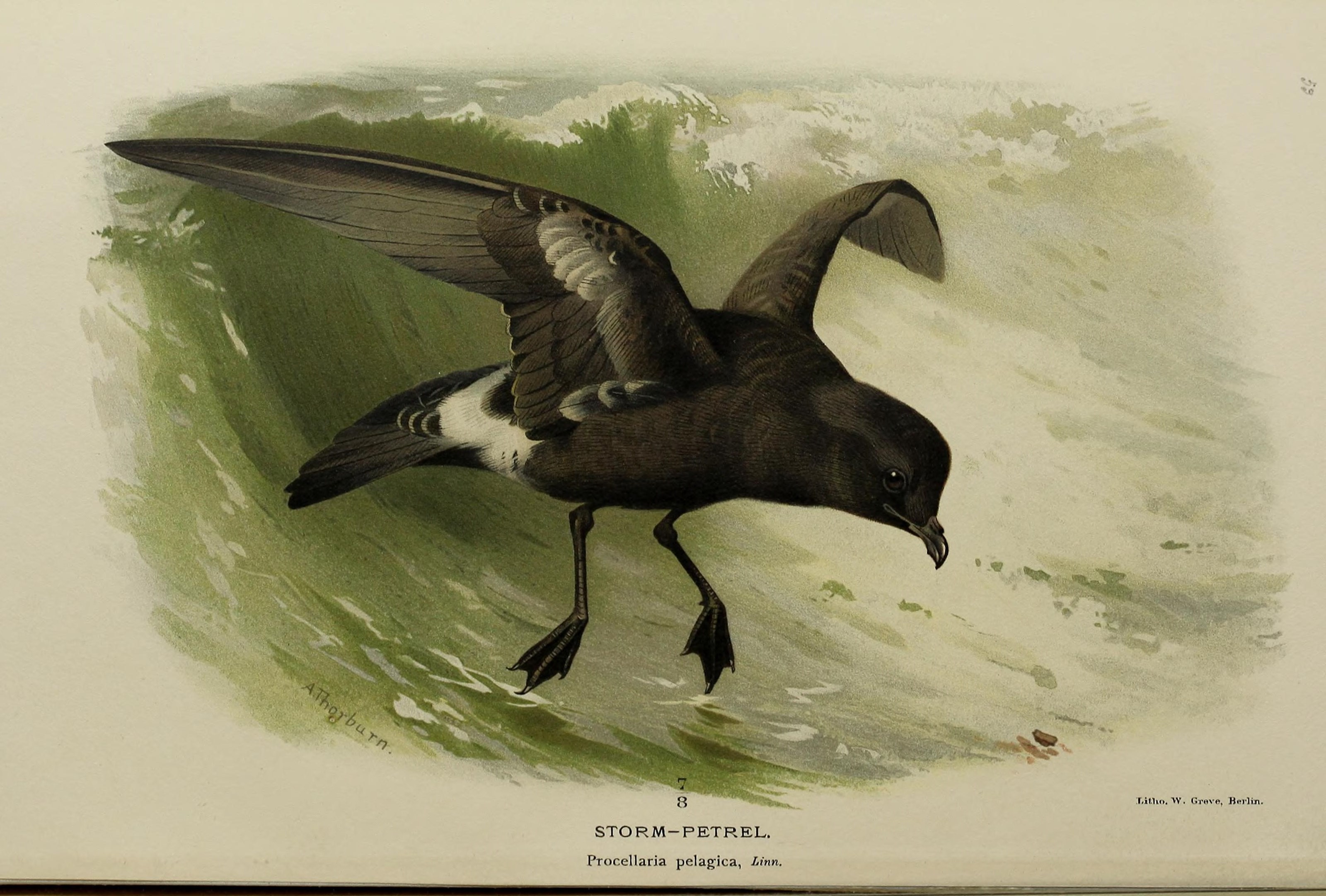
European storm petrel exhibiting its tube nose

It has been believed for a long time that birds had a very bad sense of smell, but recent studies have demonstrated that some species of birds such as the procellariiformes have a quite developed sense of smell. Olfaction seems to be used in an array of different task such as for finding food, migrating and kin recognition. In burrowing species such as in puffins, auks and petrels, smells seem to be at the basis of mate and nest recognition. The procellariiformes, also known as tubed-noses, are one of the best studied groups when it comes to olfaction as they seem to have a quite developed sense of smell. A study done on storm petrels showed that not only do petrels use olfaction in order to find their burrow and their mate, but that they are also aware of their own smell. Petrels nest in dense colonies and use the smell of their mate or their own smell in order to find their burrow and avoid entering the wrong burrow. Such a mechanism of recognition has also been shown in auks as they mostly fly at night, keeping them from using spatial memory in order to find their burrow. When looking at the available literature, olfactory cues seems to be used mostly by colonial birds that nest in burrows.

Concerning chick recognition in burrowing birds, a researcher called Eduardo Minguez (1997) showed that there was no chick recognition in storm petrels. One of the advantages of burrow nesting is that your chick is confined in the burrow until it is ready to fledge, eliminating the need for chick recognition. It is likely that chicks will acquire their "signature smell" only later upon fledging the parental nest. There are few instances of burrowing birds that have the mechanism of chick recognition, but as recognition is a costly mechanism, it tends to be lost in many bird species for which it is not necessary.

=== Acoustic recognition ===
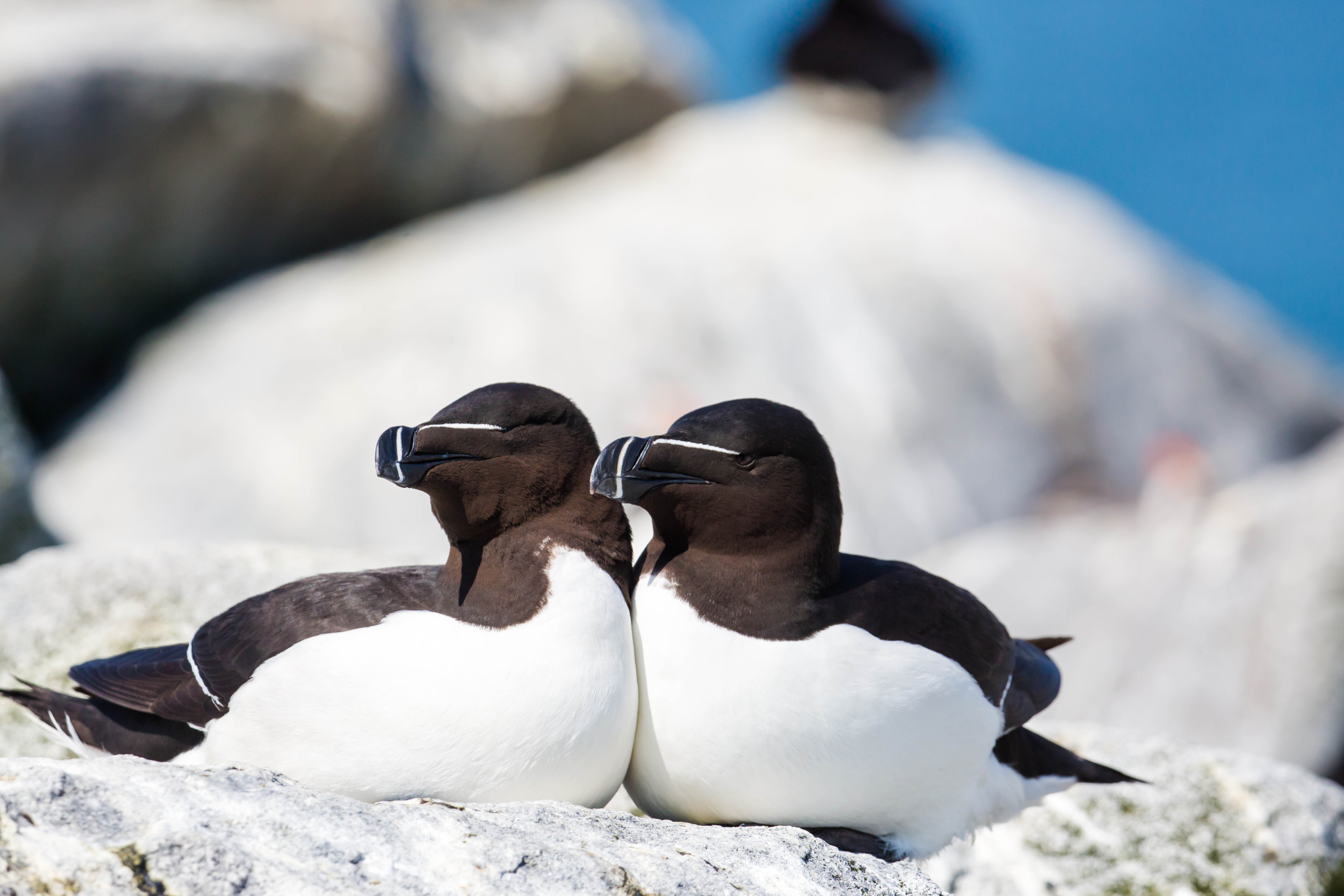
Razorbill couple on a colony site

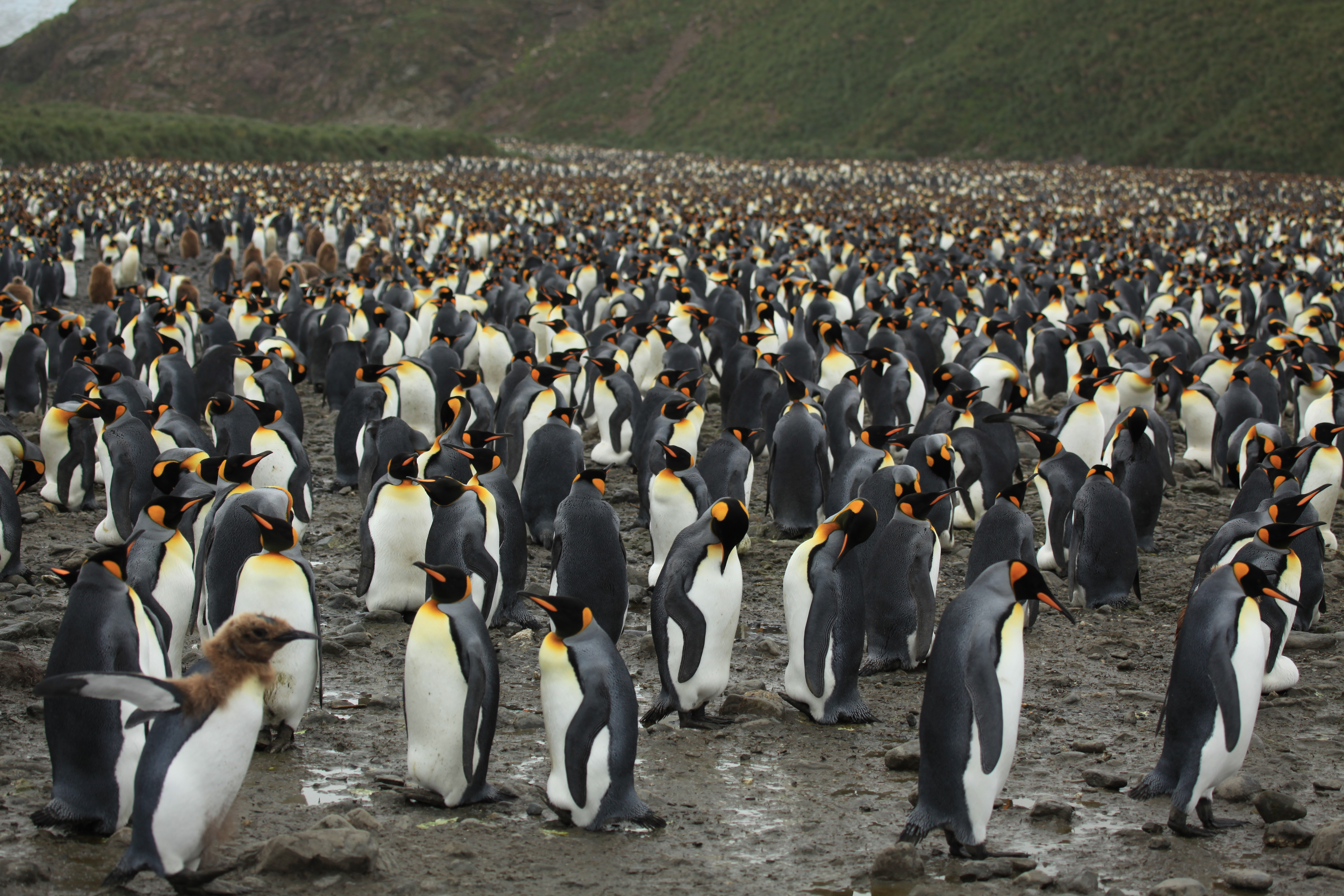
Dense colony of king penguins

In many bird colonies, the environment in the colony tends to be quite loud and filed with countless acoustic stimuli. Many researchers have looked into how individuals can identify each other in such a heavily charged acoustic environment. Recognition based on acoustic signatures has been demonstrated in many bird species such as in penguins, swallows, gulls, razorbills and more. A study done on king penguins by Jouventin et al. (1999) was one of the first study to look at the technicalities behind acoustic recognition. They found that chicks could identify their parents based on an acoustic signature specific to the pattern of the call as well as the frequency of the parents' call. The amplitude of the call did not seem to affect the call signature. A similar study done on black-headed gulls in 2001 obtained similar results supporting that the acoustic signatures of parents' calls is most likely based on a redundant pattern and the frequency of the call with no effect regarding the amplitude. This study also supported that the mechanism of acoustic recognition is most likely the same in most species within the gull family, Laridae. Nevertheless, not all members of Laridae exhibit parent-offspring recognition.

The black-legged kittiwake, a small cliff nesting gull, does not seem to recognize its chick. This lack of recognition is most likely the result of cliff nesting, as chicks cannot explore far from the nest and get mixed with other chicks. Recognition would have then been lost in kittiwakes. Other exceptions can be found, for example in razorbills. Razorbills exhibit parent-offspring recognition, but research has shown that only males and chicks exhibit such behaviour, meaning that females do not recognize their chick and vice versa. Such difference between the parents can be explained when looking at the natural history of razorbills. Like in kittiwakes, razorbills are cliff nesters, limiting the chicks movement quite a bit. However, when the chick will fledge, only the male will bring the chick out at sea and will keep caring for its chicks for a little while after fledging, creating the need to be able to recognize its own chick. As females do not follow its offspring at sea, there is no need for her to recognize her own chick.
