= Organization studies =

Academic field

Organization studies, also referred to as organization science or organizational studies, is the academic field interested in a collective activity, and how it relates to organization, organizing, and management. It is "the examination of how individuals construct organizational structures, processes, and practices, and how these, in turn, shape social relations and create institutions that ultimately influence people".

Organizational studies comprise different areas that deal with the different aspects of the organizations, many of the approaches are functionalist but critical research also provide an alternative frame for understanding in the field. Fundamental to the study of management is organizational change.

Historically, facilitating organizational change has proven to be a difficult subject, which is why different theoretical frameworks have evolved in an attempt to strategically streamline this process, such as utilizing external actors, or interim organizations, where it is important to define the expectations of the outcome of change before initiating it, so as to provide measurability.

== History ==
It has followed numerous 'turns' since its emergence in the 1960s: linguistic turn, spatial turn, practice turn, process turn, materiality turn, communication turn... A turn is a collective direction of research, focused on some coherent sets of concepts, theories, and ideas, which represent a point of bifurcation for the field itself. Most turns in organization studies relate to broader ones in social sciences and humanities. Researchers studying organizations and/or organizing processes have a recurring concern that those who work in organizations do not find organizational research particularly relevant. There is therefore a growing interest in the impact of organization studies. Public administrations also, around the world, are adopting massively new organizational models to increase their efficiency and improve public services. The Organization Studies field is becoming more popular also because the borders between a well-defined organization and customers, citizens, businesses, and professionals are more and more undefined. For example, social organization has been the subject of study in Spatio-temporal cohesiveness in human network theory.

With the recent historical turn, there is growing interest in historical organization studies, promising a closer union between organizational and historical research whose validity derives from historical veracity and conceptual rigor, enhancing understanding of historical, contemporary and future-directed social realities. Organizational studies as a discipline is also closely related to metathinking.

== Journals ==
Major academic journals of the field are, among others: Organization Science, Organization Studies, Organization Theory and Organization.

== Conferences ==
Researchers interested in organizations and organizing meet in the context of numerous conferences and workshops: the Academy of Management Annual Conference (in particular the OMT division), the European Group for Organizational Studies (EGOS), the Asia Pacific conference on Research in Organization Studies (APROS), the American and European Conference on Organization Studies (LAEMOS), the Organization Studies Summer Workshop, the International Symposium on Process Organization Studies (PROS), the Standing Conference on Organizational Symbolism (SCOS), the International Research Network (puntOorg), the Organizations, Artifacts & Practices (OAP) workshop, Organization Science Winter Conference, etc.

== Subfields ==
- Critical Management Studies - Theoretically informed critiques of management and organisation, grounded in a critical theory perspective.
- Organizational behavior – Study of human behavior in organizational settings
- Organizational culture – Customary behaviours in an organization
- Organizational ecology – Academic discipline; examines how goal-driven social entities grow, survive and die
- Organizational learning – Academic discipline; examines how goal-driven social entities add and create knowledge
- Organizational psychology – Branch of psychology
- Organizational theory – Sociological study of social organizations
- Orgology
- Management science – Study of problem-solving in human organizations
- Management cybernetics – Application of cybernetics to management and organizations

== See also ==
- Outline of organizational theory
