= Dual inheritance theory =

Theory of human behavior

Dual inheritance theory (DIT), also known as gene–culture coevolution or biocultural evolution, developed in the 1960s through early 1980s to explain human behavior as a product of two different and interacting evolutionary processes: genetic evolution and cultural evolution. Genes and culture (DIT suggests) continually interact in a feedback loop: changes in genes can lead to changes in culture which can then influence genetic selection, and vice versa. One of the theory's central claims is that culture evolves partly through a Darwinian selection process, which dual-inheritance theorists often describe by analogy to genetic evolution.

'Culture', in this context, is defined as 'socially learned behavior', and 'social learning' is defined as copying behaviors observed in others or acquiring behaviors through being taught by others. Most of the modelling done in the field relies on the first dynamic (copying), though it can be extended to the second (teaching). Social learning, at its simplest, involves blind copying of behaviors from a model (someone observed behaving), though it is also understood to have many potential biases, including success bias (copying from those who are perceived to be better off), status bias (copying from those with higher status), homophily (copying from those most like ourselves), conformist bias (disproportionately picking up behaviors that more people are performing), etc. Understanding that social learning is a system of pattern replication, and understanding that there are different rates of survival for different socially learned cultural variants – this sets up, by definition, an evolutionary structure: cultural evolution.

Because genetic evolution is relatively well-understood, most of DIT examines cultural evolution and the interactions between cultural evolution and genetic evolution.

== Theoretical basis ==
DIT holds that genetic and cultural evolution interacted in the evolution of Homo sapiens. DIT recognizes that the natural selection of genotypes is an important component of the evolution of human behavior and that cultural traits can be constrained by genetic imperatives. However, DIT also recognizes that genetic evolution has endowed the human species with a parallel evolutionary process of cultural evolution. DIT makes three main claims:

=== Culture capacities are adaptations ===
The anthropologist Robert Boyd writes:

"Four million years ago, culture likely played a minor role in the life of our ancestors. Today, we are culture-saturated creatures, completely dependent on information acquired from others."

The human capacity to store and transmit culture arose from genetically-evolved psychological mechanisms. This implies that at some point during the evolution of the human species a type of social learning leading to cumulative cultural evolution proved evolutionarily advantageous.

=== Culture evolves ===
Social-learning processes give rise to cultural evolution. Cultural traits are transmitted differently from genetic traits and, therefore, result in different population-level effects on behavioral variation.

=== Genes and culture co-evolve ===
Cultural traits alter the social and physical environments under which genetic selection operates. For example, the cultural adoptions of agriculture and dairying have, in humans, caused genetic selection for the traits to digest starch and lactose, respectively. As another example, it is likely that once culture became adaptive, genetic selection caused a refinement of the cognitive architecture that stores and transmits cultural information. This refinement may have further influenced the way culture is stored and the biases that govern its transmission.

DIT also predicts that, under certain situations, cultural evolution may select for traits that are genetically maladaptive. An example of this is the demographic transition, which describes the fall of birth-rates within industrialized societies. Dual-inheritance theorists hypothesize that the demographic transition may be a result of a prestige bias, where individuals who forgo reproduction to gain more influence in industrial societies are more likely to become cultural models.

== View of culture ==
People have defined the word "culture" to describe a large set of different phenomena. A definition that sums up what is meant by "culture" in DIT is:

Culture is socially learned information stored in individuals' brains that is capable of affecting behavior.

This view of culture emphasizes population thinking by focusing on the process by which culture is generated and maintained. It also views culture as a dynamic property of individuals, as opposed to a view of culture as a superorganic entity to which individuals must conform. This view's main advantage is that it connects individual-level processes to population-level outcomes.

== Genetic influence on cultural evolution ==
Genes affect cultural evolution via psychological predispositions on cultural learning. Genes encode the information needed to form the human brain. Genes constrain the brain's structure and, hence, the ability of the brain to acquire and store culture. Genes may also endow individuals with certain types of transmission bias (described below).

== Cultural influences on genetic evolution ==
Culture has affected the genetic evolution of human feet, legs, calves, hips, stomachs, ribs, fingers, ligaments, jaws, throats, teeth, eyes and tongues, our abilities as throwers and long-distance runners, and more.

Lactase persistence

One of the best known examples is the prevalence of the genotype for adult lactose absorption in human populations, such as Northern Europeans and some African societies, with a long history of raising cattle for milk. Until around 7,500 years ago, lactase production stopped shortly after weaning, and in societies which did not develop dairying, such as East Asians and Amerindians, this is still true today. In areas with lactase persistence, it is believed that by domesticating animals, a source of milk became available while an adult and thus strong selection for lactase persistence could occur; in a Scandinavian population, the estimated selection coefficient was 0.09-0.19. This implies that the cultural practice of raising cattle first for meat and later for milk led to selection for genetic traits for lactose digestion. Recently, analysis of natural selection on the human genome suggests that civilization has accelerated genetic change in humans over the past 10,000 years.

Food processing

Culture has driven changes to the human digestive systems making many digestive organs, such as teeth or stomach, smaller than expected for primates of a similar size, and has been attributed to one of the reasons why humans have such large brains compared to other great apes. This is due to food processing. Early examples of food processing include pounding, marinating and most notably cooking. Pounding meat breaks down the muscle fibres, hence taking away some of the job from the mouth, teeth and jaw. Marinating emulates the action of the stomach with high acid levels. Cooking partially breaks down food making it more easily digestible. Food enters the body effectively partly digested, and as such food processing reduces the work that the digestive system has to do. This means that there is selection for smaller digestive organs as the tissue is energetically expensive, those with smaller digestive organs can process their food but at a lower energetic cost than those with larger organs. Cooking is notable because the energy available from food increases when cooked and this also means less time is spent looking for food.

Humans living on cooked diets spend only a fraction of their day chewing compared to other extant primates living on raw diets. American girls and boys spent on average 7 to 8 percent of their day chewing respectively (1.68 to 1.92 hours per day), compared to chimpanzees, who spend more than 6 hours a day chewing. This frees up time which can be used for hunting. A raw diet means hunting is constrained since time spent hunting is time not spent eating and chewing plant material, but cooking reduces the time required to get the day's energy requirements, allowing for more subsistence activities. Digestibility of cooked carbohydrates is approximately on average 30% higher than digestibility of non-cooked carbohydrates. This increased energy intake, more free time and savings made on tissue used in the digestive system allowed for the selection of genes for larger brain size.

Despite its benefits, brain tissue requires a large amount of calories, hence a main constraint in selection for larger brains is calorie intake. A greater calorie intake can support greater quantities of brain tissue. This is argued to explain why human brains can be much larger than other apes, since humans are the only ape to engage in food processing. The cooking of food has influenced genes to the extent that, research suggests, humans cannot live without cooking. A study on 513 individuals consuming long-term raw diets found that as the percentage of their diet which was made up of raw food and/or the length they had been on a diet of raw food increased, their BMI decreased. This is despite access to many non-thermal processing, like grinding, pounding or heating to 48 °C. (118 °F). With approximately 86 billion neurons in the human brain and 60–70 kg body mass, an exclusively raw diet close to that of what extant primates have would be not viable as, when modelled, it is argued that it would require an infeasible level of more than nine hours of feeding every day. However, this is contested, with alternative modelling showing enough calories could be obtained within 5–6 hours per day. Some scientists and anthropologists point to evidence that brain size in the Homo lineage started to increase well before the advent of cooking due to increased consumption of meat and that basic food processing (slicing) accounts for the size reduction in organs related to chewing. Cornélio et al. argues that improving cooperative abilities and a varying of diet to more meat and seeds improved foraging and hunting efficiency. It is this that allowed for the brain expansion, independent of cooking which they argue came much later, a consequence from the complex cognition that developed. Yet this is still an example of a cultural shift in diet and the resulting genetic evolution. Further criticism comes from the controversy of the archaeological evidence available. Some claim there is a lack of evidence of fire control when brain sizes first started expanding. Wrangham argues that anatomical evidence around the time of the origin of Homo erectus (1.8 million years ago), indicates that the control of fire and hence cooking occurred. At this time, the largest reductions in tooth size in the entirety of human evolution occurred, indicating that softer foods became prevalent in the diet. Also at this time was a narrowing of the pelvis indicating a smaller gut and also there is evidence that there was a loss of the ability to climb which Wrangham argues indicates the control of fire, since sleeping on the ground needs fire to ward off predators. The proposed increases in brain size from food processing will have led to a greater mental capacity for further cultural innovation in food processing which will have increased digestive efficiency further providing more energy for further gains in brain size. This positive feedback loop is argued to have led to the rapid brain size increases seen in the Homo lineage.

== Mechanisms of cultural evolution ==
In DIT, the evolution and maintenance of cultures is described by five major mechanisms: natural selection of cultural variants, random variation, cultural drift, guided variation and transmission bias.

=== Natural selection ===
Differences between cultural phenomena result in differential rates of their spread; similarly, cultural differences among individuals can lead to differential survival and reproduction rates of individuals. The patterns of this selective process depend on transmission biases and can result in behavior that is more adaptive to a given environment.

=== Random variation ===
Random variation arises from errors in the learning, display or recall of cultural information, and is roughly analogous to the process of mutation in genetic evolution.

=== Cultural drift ===
Cultural drift is a process roughly analogous to genetic drift in evolutionary biology. In cultural drift, the frequency of cultural traits in a population may be subject to random fluctuations due to chance variations in which traits are observed and transmitted (sometimes called "sampling error"). These fluctuations might cause cultural variants to disappear from a population. This effect should be especially strong in small populations. A model by Hahn and Bentley shows that cultural drift gives a reasonably good approximation to changes in the popularity of American baby names. Drift processes have also been suggested to explain changes in archaeological pottery and technology patent applications. Changes in the songs of song birds are also thought to arise from drift processes, where distinct dialects in different groups occur due to errors in songbird singing and acquisition by successive generations. Cultural drift is also observed in an early computer model of cultural evolution.

=== Guided variation ===
Cultural traits may be gained in a population through the process of individual learning. Once an individual learns a novel trait, it can be transmitted to other members of the population. The process of guided variation depends on an adaptive standard that determines what cultural variants are learned.

=== Biased transmission ===
Understanding the different ways that culture traits can be transmitted between individuals has been an important part of DIT research since the 1970s. Transmission biases occur when some cultural variants are favored over others during the process of cultural transmission. Boyd and Richerson (1985) defined and analytically modeled a number of possible transmission biases. The list of biases has been refined over the years, especially by Henrich and McElreath.

==== Content bias ====
Content biases result from situations where some aspect of a cultural variant's content makes them more likely to be adopted. Content biases can result from genetic preferences, preferences determined by existing cultural traits, or a combination of the two. For example, food preferences can result from genetic preferences for sugary or fatty foods and socially-learned eating practices and taboos. Content biases are sometimes called "direct biases."

==== Context bias ====
Context biases result from individuals using clues about the social structure of their population to determine what cultural variants to adopt. This determination is made without reference to the content of the variant. There are two major categories of context biases: model-based biases, and frequency-dependent biases.

==== Model-based biases ====
Model-based biases result when an individual is biased to choose a particular "cultural model" to imitate. There are four major categories of model-based biases: prestige bias, skill bias, success bias, and similarity bias. A "prestige bias" results when individuals are more likely to imitate cultural models that are seen as having more prestige. A measure of prestige could be the amount of deference shown to a potential cultural model by other individuals. A "skill bias" results when individuals can directly observe different cultural models performing a learned skill and are more likely to imitate cultural models that perform better at the specific skill. A "success bias" results from individuals preferentially imitating cultural models that they determine are most generally successful (as opposed to successful at a specific skill as in the skill bias.) A "similarity bias" results when individuals are more likely to imitate cultural models that are perceived as being similar to the individual based on specific traits.

==== Frequency-dependent biases ====
Frequency-dependent biases result when an individual is biased to choose particular cultural variants based on their perceived frequency in the population. The most explored frequency-dependent bias is the "conformity bias." Conformity biases result when individuals attempt to copy the mean or the mode cultural variant in the population. Another possible frequency dependent bias is the "rarity bias." The rarity bias results when individuals preferentially choose cultural variants that are less common in the population. The rarity bias is also sometimes called a "nonconformist" or "anti-conformist" bias.

== Social learning and cumulative cultural evolution ==
In DIT, the evolution of culture is dependent on the evolution of social learning. Analytic models show that social learning becomes evolutionarily beneficial when the environment changes with enough frequency that genetic inheritance can not track the changes, but not fast enough that individual learning is more efficient. For environments that have very little variability, social learning is not needed since genes can adapt fast enough to the changes that occur, and innate behaviour is able to deal with the constant environment. In fast changing environments cultural learning would not be useful because what the previous generation knew is now outdated and will provide no benefit in the changed environment, and hence individual learning is more beneficial. It is only in the moderately changing environment where cultural learning becomes useful since each generation shares a mostly similar environment but genes have insufficient time to change to changes in the environment. While other species have social learning, and thus some level of culture, only humans show evidence of cumulative cultural evolution. Boyd and Richerson argue that the evolution of cumulative culture depends on observational learning and is uncommon in other species because it is ineffective when it is rare in a population. They propose that the environmental changes occurring in the Pleistocene may have provided the right environmental conditions. Michael Tomasello argues that cumulative cultural evolution results from a ratchet effect that began when humans developed the cognitive architecture to understand others as mental agents. Furthermore, Tomasello proposed in the 80s that there are some disparities between the observational learning mechanisms found in humans and great apes - which go some way to explain the observable difference between great ape traditions and human types of culture (see Emulation (observational learning)).

== Cultural group selection ==
Although group selection is commonly thought to be nonexistent or unimportant in genetic evolution, DIT predicts that, due to the nature of cultural inheritance, it may be an important force in cultural evolution. Group selection occurs in cultural evolution because conformist biases make it difficult for novel cultural traits to spread through a population (see above section on transmission biases). Conformist bias also helps maintain variation between groups. These two properties, rare in genetic transmission, are necessary for group selection to operate. Based on an earlier model by Cavalli-Sforza and Feldman, Boyd and Richerson show that conformist biases are almost inevitable when traits spread through social learning, implying that group selection is common in cultural evolution. Analysis of small groups in New Guinea imply that cultural group selection might be a good explanation for slowly changing aspects of social structure, but not for rapidly changing fads. The ability of cultural evolution to maintain intergroup diversity is what allows for the study of cultural phylogenetics.

== Historical development ==
In 1876, Friedrich Engels wrote a manuscript titled The Part Played by Labour in the Transition from Ape to Man, accredited as a founding document of DIT; "The approach to gene-culture coevolution first developed by Engels and developed later on by anthropologists…" is described by Stephen Jay Gould as "…the best nineteenth-century case for gene-culture coevolution." The idea that human cultures undergo a similar evolutionary process as genetic evolution also goes back to Darwin. In the 1960s, Donald T. Campbell published some of the first theoretical work that adapted principles of evolutionary theory to the evolution of cultures. In 1976, two developments in cultural evolutionary theory set the stage for DIT. In that year Richard Dawkins's The Selfish Gene introduced ideas of cultural evolution to a popular audience. Although one of the best-selling science books of all time, because of its lack of mathematical rigor, it had little effect on the development of DIT. Also in 1976, geneticists Marcus Feldman and Luigi Luca Cavalli-Sforza published the first dynamic models of gene–culture coevolution. These models were to form the basis for subsequent work on DIT, heralded by the publication of three seminal books in the 1980s.

The first was Charles Lumsden and E.O. Wilson's Genes, Mind and Culture. This book outlined a series of mathematical models of how genetic evolution might favor the selection of cultural traits and how cultural traits might, in turn, affect the speed of genetic evolution. While it was the first book published describing how genes and culture might coevolve, it had relatively little effect on the further development of DIT. Some critics felt that their models depended too heavily on genetic mechanisms at the expense of cultural mechanisms. Controversy surrounding Wilson's sociobiological theories may also have decreased the lasting effect of this book.

The second 1981 book was Cavalli-Sforza and Feldman's Cultural Transmission and Evolution: A Quantitative Approach. Borrowing heavily from population genetics and epidemiology, this book built a mathematical theory concerning the spread of cultural traits. It describes the evolutionary implications of vertical transmission, passing cultural traits from parents to offspring; oblique transmission, passing cultural traits from any member of an older generation to a younger generation; and horizontal transmission, passing traits between members of the same population.

The next significant DIT publication was Robert Boyd and Peter Richerson's 1985 Culture and the Evolutionary Process. This book presents the now-standard mathematical models of the evolution of social learning under different environmental conditions, the population effects of social learning, various forces of selection on cultural learning rules, different forms of biased transmission and their population-level effects, and conflicts between cultural and genetic evolution. The book's conclusion also outlined areas for future research that are still relevant today.

== Current and future research ==
In their 1985 book, Boyd and Richerson outlined an agenda for future DIT research. This agenda, outlined below, called for the development of both theoretical models and empirical research. DIT has since built a rich tradition of theoretical models over the past two decades. However, there has not been a comparable level of empirical work.

In a 2006 interview Harvard biologist E. O. Wilson expressed disappointment at the little attention afforded to DIT:

"...for some reason I haven't fully fathomed, this most promising frontier of scientific research has attracted very few people and very little effort."

Kevin Laland and Gillian Ruth Brown attribute this lack of attention to DIT's heavy reliance on formal modeling.

"In many ways the most complex and potentially rewarding of all approaches, [DIT], with its multiple processes and cerebral onslaught of sigmas and deltas, may appear too abstract to all but the most enthusiastic reader. Until such a time as the theoretical hieroglyphics can be translated into a respectable empirical science most observers will remain immune to its message."

Economist Herbert Gintis disagrees with this critique, citing empirical work as well as more recent work using techniques from behavioral economics. These behavioral economic techniques have been adapted to test predictions of cultural evolutionary models in laboratory settings as well as studying differences in cooperation in fifteen small-scale societies in the field.

Since one of the goals of DIT is to explain the distribution of human cultural traits, ethnographic and ethnologic techniques may also be useful for testing hypothesis stemming from DIT. Although findings from traditional ethnologic studies have been used to buttress DIT arguments, thus far there have been little ethnographic fieldwork designed to explicitly test these hypotheses.

Herb Gintis has named DIT one of the two major conceptual theories with potential for unifying the behavioral sciences, including economics, biology, anthropology, sociology, psychology and political science. Because it addresses both the genetic and cultural components of human inheritance, Gintis sees DIT models as providing the best explanations for the ultimate cause of human behavior and the best paradigm for integrating those disciplines with evolutionary theory. In a review of competing evolutionary perspectives on human behavior, Laland and Brown see DIT as the best candidate for uniting the other evolutionary perspectives under one theoretical umbrella.

== Relation to other fields ==
=== Sociology and cultural anthropology ===
Two major topics of study in both sociology and cultural anthropology are human cultures and cultural variation. However, Dual Inheritance theorists charge that both disciplines too often treat culture as a static superorganic entity that dictates human behavior. Cultures are defined by a suite of common traits shared by a large group of people. DIT theorists argue that this doesn't sufficiently explain variation in cultural traits at the individual level. By contrast, DIT models human culture at the individual level and views culture as the result of a dynamic evolutionary process at the population level.

=== Human sociobiology and evolutionary psychology ===
Evolutionary psychologists study the evolved architecture of the human mind. They see it as composed of many different programs that process information, each with assumptions and procedures that were specialized by natural selection to solve a different adaptive problem faced by our hunter-gatherer ancestors (e.g., choosing mates, hunting, avoiding predators, cooperating, using aggression). These evolved programs contain content-rich assumptions about how the world and other people work. When ideas are passed from mind to mind, they are changed by these evolved inference systems (much like messages get changed in a game of telephone). But the changes are not usually random. Evolved programs add and subtract information, reshaping the ideas in ways that make them more "intuitive", more memorable, and more attention-grabbing. In other words, "memes" (ideas) are not precisely like genes. Genes are normally copied faithfully as they are replicated, but ideas normally are not. It's not just that ideas mutate every once in a while, like genes do. Ideas are transformed every time they are passed from mind to mind, because the sender's message is being interpreted by evolved inference systems in the receiver. It is useful for some applications to note, however, that there are ways to pass ideas which are more resilient and involve substantially less mutation, such as by mass distribution of printed media.

There is no necessary contradiction between evolutionary psychology and DIT, but evolutionary psychologists argue that the psychology implicit in many DIT models is too simple; evolved programs have a rich inferential structure not captured by the idea of a "content bias". They also argue that some of the phenomena DIT models attribute to cultural evolution are cases of "evoked culture"—situations in which different evolved programs are activated in different places, in response to cues in the environment.

Sociobiologists try to understand how maximizing genetic fitness, in either the modern era or past environments, can explain human behavior. When faced with a trait that seems maladaptive, some sociobiologists try to determine how the trait actually increases genetic fitness (maybe through kin selection or by speculating about early evolutionary environments). Dual inheritance theorists, in contrast, will consider a variety of genetic and cultural processes in addition to natural selection on genes.

=== Human behavioral ecology ===
Human behavioral ecology (HBE) and DIT have a similar relationship to what ecology and evolutionary biology have in the biological sciences. HBE is more concerned about ecological process and DIT more focused on historical process. One difference is that human behavioral ecologists often assume that culture is a system that produces the most adaptive outcome in a given environment. This implies that similar behavioral traditions should be found in similar environments. However, this is not always the case. A study of African cultures showed that cultural history was a better predictor of cultural traits than local ecological conditions.

=== Memetics ===
Memetics, which comes from the meme idea described in Dawkins's The Selfish Gene, is similar to DIT in that it treats culture as an evolutionary process that is distinct from genetic transmission. However, there are some philosophical differences between memetics and DIT. One difference is that memetics' focus is on the selection potential of discrete replicators (memes), where DIT allows for transmission of both non-replicators and non-discrete cultural variants. DIT does not assume that replicators are necessary for cumulative adaptive evolution. DIT also more strongly emphasizes the role of genetic inheritance in shaping the capacity for cultural evolution. But perhaps the biggest difference is a difference in academic lineage. Memetics as a label is more influential in popular culture than in academia. Critics of memetics argue that it is lacking in empirical support or is conceptually ill-founded, and question whether there is hope for the memetic research program succeeding. Proponents point out that many cultural traits are discrete, and that many existing models of cultural inheritance assume discrete cultural units, and hence involve memes.

== Criticisms ==
Israeli psychologist Liane Gabora has criticised DIT. She argues that traits that are not transmitted by way of a self-assembly code (as in genetic evolution) is misleading, because this second use does not capture the algorithmic structure that makes an inheritance system require a particular kind of mathematical framework.

Other criticisms of the effort to frame culture in tandem with evolution have been leveled by Richard Lewontin, Niles Eldredge, and Stuart Kauffman.

== See also ==
- Nature versus nurture – Long-standing debate in biology and society
- Adaptive bias – Theory of bias in human reasoning
- Cultural selection theory – Study of cultural change modelled on theories of evolutionary biology
- Memetics – Study of self-replicating units of culture
- Sociocultural evolution – Evolution of societies
- Expensive tissue hypothesis – Hypothesis in evolutionary biology
