= Anti-nesting principle =

Concept in the philosophy of consciousness

In the philosophy of consciousness, the anti-nesting principle states that one state of consciousness cannot exist within another.

Proponents of the anti-nesting principle include Giulio Tononi and Hilary Putnam.
