= Integrated information theory =

Theory within consciousness research

Phi, the symbol used for integrated information

Integrated information theory (IIT) proposes a mathematical model for the consciousness of a system. It comprises a framework ultimately intended to explain why some physical systems (such as human brains) are conscious, and to be capable of providing a concrete inference about whether any physical system is conscious, to what degree, and what particular experience it has; why they feel the particular way they do in particular states (e.g. why our visual field appears extended when we gaze out at the night sky), and what it would take for other physical systems to be conscious (Are other animals conscious? Might the whole universe be?). The theory inspired the development of new clinical techniques to empirically assess consciousness in unresponsive patients.

According to IIT, integrated information (Φ) corresponds to the quantity of consciousness. That is, a system's consciousness (what it is like subjectively) is conjectured to be mathematically described by the system's causal structure (what it is like objectively). Therefore, it should be possible to account for the conscious experience of a physical system by unfolding its complete causal powers.

IIT was proposed by neuroscientist Giulio Tononi in 2004. Despite significant interest, IIT remains controversial. In 2023, a number of scholars characterized it as unfalsifiable pseudoscience for lacking sufficient empirical support, a claim reiterated in a 2025 Nature Neuroscience commentary. A survey of researchers in the field found only a small minority fully endorsing the "pseudoscience" label. Other researchers have defended the theory in response.

== Overview ==
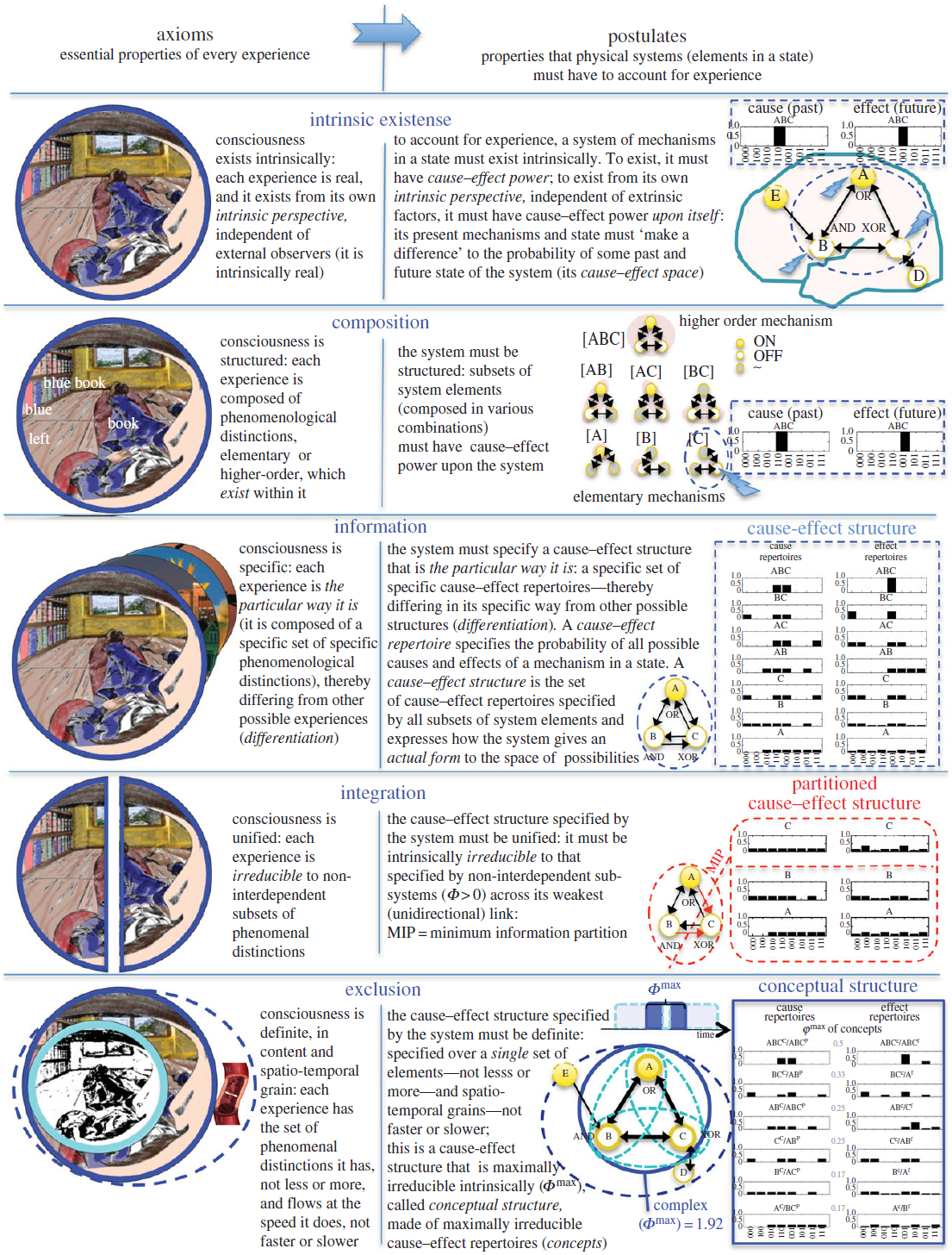
Detailed description of the axioms and postulates of IIT by Giulio Tononi and Christof Koch

=== Relationship to the "hard problem of consciousness" ===
David Chalmers has argued that any attempt to explain consciousness in purely physical terms (i.e., to start with the laws of physics as they are currently formulated and derive the necessary and inevitable existence of consciousness) eventually runs into the so-called "hard problem". Rather than try to start from physical principles and arrive at consciousness, IIT "starts with consciousness" (accepts the existence of our own consciousness as certain) and reasons about the properties that a postulated physical substrate would need to have in order to account for it. The ability to perform this jump from phenomenology to mechanism rests on IIT's assumption that if the formal properties of a conscious experience can be fully accounted for by an underlying physical system, then the properties of the physical system must be constrained by the properties of the experience. The limitations on the physical system for consciousness to exist are unknown and consciousness may exist on a spectrum, as implied by studies involving split-brain patients and conscious patients with large amounts of brain matter missing.

IIT aims to explain which physical systems are conscious, to what degree, and in what way. The theory begins from the phenomenological certainty that experience exists, and infers necessary physical postulates that any conscious substrate must satisfy. Specifically, IIT moves from phenomenology to mechanism by attempting to identify the essential properties of conscious experience (dubbed "axioms") and, from there, the essential properties of conscious physical systems (dubbed "postulates").

IIT is grounded in:

- Realism – something exists, and persists, independently of one's own experience (a better hypothesis than solipsism)
- Operational physicalism – what exists is assessed operationally, by observing and manipulating a substrate's units to establish that they can reliably "take and make a difference"; this cause–effect power is the signature of physical existence
- Operational reductionism ("atomism") – what exists physically should ideally be accounted for in terms of the smallest units that can be observed and manipulated, so that cause–effect power holds "all the way down" to the atomic units

=== Axioms and postulates ===
Starting from the zeroth axiom (experience exists), IIT identifies five essential properties of experience:

- Intrinsicality – experience is intrinsic: it exists for itself
- Information – experience is specific: it is this one
- Integration – experience is unitary: it is a whole, irreducible to separate experiences
- Exclusion – experience is definite: it is this whole
- Composition – experience is structured: it is composed of distinctions and the relations that bind them together, yielding a phenomenal structure that feels the way it feels

Each axiom is formulated as a corresponding physical postulate that the substrate of consciousness must satisfy, expressed in terms of cause–effect power:

- Intrinsicality – its cause–effect power must be intrinsic: it must take and make a difference within itself
- Information – its cause–effect power must be specific: it must be in this state and select this cause–effect state, the one with maximal intrinsic information (ii)
- Integration – its cause–effect power must be unitary: it must specify its cause–effect state as a whole set of units, irreducible to separate subsets of units; irreducibility is measured by integrated information (φ_{s}) over the substrate's minimum partition
- Exclusion – its cause–effect power must be definite: it must specify its cause–effect state as this whole set of units, namely the set that is maximally irreducible (maximum φ_{s}, φ*), called a maximal substrate or complex
- Composition – its cause–effect power must be structured: subsets of its units must specify cause–effect states over subsets of units (distinctions) that can overlap with one another (relations), yielding a cause–effect structure or Φ-structure

=== Mathematical formalism ===
A system is described by its transition probability matrix (TPM), denoted $T_U = p(\mathbf{u}' \mid \mathbf{u})$, over all its possible states. The formalism proceeds in two stages: first identifying the maximally irreducible set of units (the complex), then unfolding its cause–effect structure. From this, IIT defines:

Intrinsic information (ii) measures how much a state $s$ constrains a cause/effect state $\tilde{s}$, capturing both selectivity and informativeness. It is evaluated relative to the unconstrained probability $p_{uc}(\tilde{s})$ using the intrinsic difference measure, and the relevant state is the one that maximizes this quantity:

$\text{ii}(s, \tilde{s}^*) = \max_{\tilde{s}} \; p(\tilde{s} \mid s) \log_2 \left( \frac{p(\tilde{s} \mid s)}{p_{uc}(\tilde{s})} \right)$

Intrinsic information is computed using the intrinsic difference (ID), which IIT 4.0 identifies as the unique measure of the difference between two probability distributions that satisfies the properties of causality, intrinsicality, and specificity required by the postulates. It is evaluated separately on the cause side ($\text{ii}_c$) and the effect side ($\text{ii}_e$).

System integrated information ($\phi_s$) as the irreducibility of the system's cause–effect power over itself. It is measured over the directional minimum partition (MIP)—the partition, cutting the inputs and/or outputs of each part, that makes the least difference—and, by the principle of minimal existence, is taken as the minimum of the irreducibility on the cause side ($\phi_c$) and the effect side ($\phi_e$):

$\phi_s = \min\left( \phi_c, \phi_e \right), \qquad \phi_{c/e} = \min_{\theta} \left[ \text{ii}_{c/e}(s, \tilde{s}) - \text{ii}_{c/e, \theta}(s, \tilde{s}) \right]$

Complexes (maximal substrates) are the sets of units whose system integrated information $\phi_s$ is maximal relative to all overlapping candidate systems—whether subsets, supersets, or partially overlapping sets—in accordance with the exclusion postulate. A complex's distinctions are its subsets of units (mechanisms) that specify a maximally irreducible cause and effect state over subsets of units (purviews), each with an associated irreducibility $\phi_d$. Relations are the congruent overlaps among the cause and/or effect states of these distinctions, each with an associated irreducibility $\phi_r$. Together, distinctions and relations compose the cause–effect structure, or $\Phi$-structure, of the complex:

$\Phi = \sum_{\text{distinctions}} \phi_d + \sum_{\text{relations}} \phi_r$

The structure integrated information $\Phi$ ("big phi") corresponds to the quantity of consciousness, while the particular structure of distinctions and relations defines its quality.

=== Explanatory identity ===
IIT proposes an explanatory identity: an experience is identical to the cause–effect structure (Φ-structure) unfolded from a complex (maximal substrate) in its current state, such that every property of the experience is accounted for by a corresponding property of the Φ-structure, with no additional ingredients. The identity is meant to be explanatory rather than ontologically reductive: IIT does not claim that experience "arises from" or is "nothing but" a Φ-structure, but that the properties of an experience can be accounted for, in objective and physical terms, by those of a substrate that can be observed and manipulated.

=== Contents of experience ===
Beyond accounting for the quantity of consciousness (Φ), IIT aims to account for its quality—specific contents of experience, such as colours and shapes, sounds, the spatial extendedness of the visual field and the feeling of time flowing. On the theory's central claim that the explanatory identity extends to phenomenal quality, every property of an experience must be accounted for by a corresponding property of the cause–effect structure (Φ-structure) unfolded by the substrate, together with its sub-structures. In summary, IIT holds that "all quality is structure".

Research within the programme has so far concentrated on two especially pervasive modes of experience that are relatively accessible to introspection: the extendedness of space and the flow of time. The account of spatial experience holds that for the "canvas" of space to feel extended, it must be composed of many phenomenal distinctions ("spots"), each of which overlaps itself (reflexivity), related to one another through inclusion, connection, and fusion. IIT shows that a substrate of units with grid-like connectivity specifies a cause–effect structure whose distinctions and relations reproduce these properties — it is that structure, rather than the connectivity as such, that accounts for the way space feels — and predicts that spatial experience is supported by brain regions with grid-like connectivity. The account of temporal experience applies the same principles to directed grids: the conscious present feels flowing because it is composed of phenomenal distinctions ("moments") that are directed — pointing away from themselves, where spots point to themselves — and related through directed inclusion, connection, and fusion, so that time is understood not as a process in clock time but as a structure specified by the substrate's current state, extending between the now and the then. IIT proposes that accounts of further contents can be pursued in the same manner: objects, understood as the binding of a general concept with a particular configuration of features within a hierarchy, and narrow qualia such as hues.

== Extensions ==
The calculation of even a modestly-sized system's $\Phi^{\textrm{Max}}$ is often computationally intractable, so efforts have been made to develop heuristic or proxy measures of integrated information. For example, Masafumi Oizumi and colleagues have developed both $\Phi^*$ and geometric integrated information or $\Phi^G$, which are practical approximations for integrated information. These are related to proxy measures developed earlier by Anil Seth and Adam Barrett. However, none of these proxy measures have a mathematically proven relationship to the actual $\Phi^{\textrm{Max}}$ value, which complicates the interpretation of analyses that use them. They can give qualitatively different results even for very small systems.

In 2021, Angus Leung and colleagues published a direct application of IIT's mathematical formalism to neural data. To circumvent the computational challenges associated with larger datasets, the authors focused on neuronal population activity in the fly. The study showed that $\Phi^{\textrm{Max}}$ can readily be computed for smaller sets of neural data. Moreover, matching IIT's predictions, $\Phi^{\textrm{Max}}$ was significantly decreased when the animals underwent general anesthesia.

A significant computational challenge in calculating integrated information is finding the minimum information partition of a neural system, which requires iterating through all possible network partitions. To solve this problem, Daniel Toker and Friedrich T. Sommer have shown that the spectral decomposition of the correlation matrix of a system's dynamics is a quick and robust proxy for the minimum information partition.

== Related experimental work ==
While the algorithm for assessing a system's $\Phi^{\textrm{Max}}$ and conceptual structure is relatively straightforward, its high time complexity makes it computationally intractable for many systems of interest. Heuristics and approximations can sometimes be used to provide ballpark estimates of a complex system's integrated information, but precise calculations are often impossible. These computational challenges, combined with the already difficult task of reliably and accurately assessing consciousness under experimental conditions, make testing many of the theory's predictions difficult.

Despite these challenges, researchers have attempted to use measures of information integration and differentiation to assess levels of consciousness in a variety of subjects. For instance, a recent study using a less computationally-intensive proxy for $\Phi^{\textrm{Max}}$ was able to reliably discriminate between varying levels of consciousness in wakeful, sleeping (dreaming vs. non-dreaming), anesthetized, and comatose (vegetative vs. minimally-conscious vs. locked-in) individuals.

The theory has found practical application in the development of the Perturbational Complexity Index (PCI), an empirical measure used in clinical neuroscience to assess the level of consciousness in patients by quantifying the brain's capacity for integrated information through TMS-EEG recordings.

IIT also makes several predictions which fit well with existing experimental evidence, and can be used to explain some counterintuitive findings in consciousness research. For example, IIT can be used to explain why some brain regions, such as the cerebellum do not appear to contribute to consciousness, despite their size and/or functional importance.

== Implications ==
=== AI consciousness ===
Because IIT identifies consciousness with a substrate's intrinsic cause–effect power rather than with the functions that substrate performs, it implies that intelligence and consciousness are dissociable: a system might reproduce human behaviour in full while experiencing nothing. The theory therefore stands opposed to computational functionalism, on which carrying out computations of the appropriate kind is necessary and sufficient for consciousness. A 2025 Nature Neuroscience commentary by Giulio Tononi and colleagues casts this disagreement as a clash of paradigms, arguing that on IIT, computers that replicate our behaviour or cognitive functions would "not be conscious, but act as if they were", a condition the authors term pseudo-consciousness.

In a 2024 preprint, Graham Findlay, William Marshall, Larissa Albantakis, Isaac David, William G. P. Mayner, Christof Koch and Tononi applied IIT's postulates to a pair of systems built from Boolean units: a small target system, and a basic stored-program digital computer programmed to simulate it with full functional equivalence. Although the computer reproduced the target's input–output behaviour exactly, neither the machine as a whole, nor any subset of its units, nor any coarse-graining of them permitted by the postulates, reproduced the target's cause–effect structure; assessed at the grain of its individual units it fragmented instead into many small complexes of negligible Φ. The authors conclude that two systems can be functionally equivalent without being phenomenally equivalent, and that this conclusion does not depend on which function is being simulated.

The paper attributes this to the architecture of conventional machines rather than to any shortfall in their computing power: a central processing unit, registers, a clock, and the separation of processing from memory introduce bottlenecks that force the simulated constituents of a target system—virtual neurons, say—to be multiplexed through the same physical units. The authors conjecture that machines relying on CPUs or GPUs would therefore support negligible consciousness even if they replicated human cognition neuron by neuron, while emphasising that this holds only to the extent that IIT itself is valid and does not rule out artificial consciousness in general; neuromorphic hardware and quantum computers are left as open questions, and they propose a converse dissociation on which systems such as cerebral organoids could support experience while displaying little intelligent behaviour.

== Reception ==
Integrated information theory has received both broad criticism and support.

=== Support ===
Neuroscientist Christof Koch, who has helped to develop later versions of the theory, has called IIT "the only really promising fundamental theory of consciousness".

Neuroscientist and consciousness researcher Anil Seth is supportive of the theory, with some caveats, claiming that "conscious experiences are highly informative and always integrated."; and that "One thing that immediately follows from [IIT] is that you have a nice post hoc explanation for certain things we know about consciousness.". But he also claims "the parts of IIT that I find less promising are where it claims that integrated information actually is consciousness — that there's an identity between the two.", and has criticized the panpsychist extrapolations of the theory.

Philosopher David Chalmers, famous for the idea of the hard problem of consciousness, has expressed some enthusiasm about IIT. According to Chalmers, IIT is a development in the right direction, whether or not it is correct.

Max Tegmark has tried to address the problem of the computational complexity behind the calculations. According to Max Tegmark "the integration measure proposed by IIT is computationally infeasible to evaluate for large systems, growing super-exponentially with the system's information content." As a result, Φ can only be approximated in general. However, different ways of approximating Φ provide radically different results. Other works have shown that Φ can be computed in some large mean-field neural network models, although some assumptions of the theory have to be revised to capture phase transitions in these large systems.

In 2019, the Templeton Foundation announced funding in excess of $6,000,000 to test opposing empirical predictions of IIT and a rival theory (Global Neuronal Workspace Theory, GNWT). The originators of both theories signed off on experimental protocols and data analyses as well as the exact conditions that satisfy if their championed theory correctly predicted the outcome or not. Initial results were revealed in June 2023. None of GNWT's predictions passed what was agreed upon pre-registration while two out of three of IIT's predictions passed that threshold. The final, peer-reviewed results were published in the 30 April 2025 issue of Nature. In an accompanying editorial, the editors of Nature noted that "after the initial release of the results, an open letter was circulated in which IIT was described as a pseudoscience", and added that "such language has no place in a process designed to establish working relationships between competing groups."

In a March 2025 Nature Neuroscience commentary titled "Consciousness or pseudo-consciousness? A clash of two paradigms", proponents of IIT listed 16 peer-reviewed studies as empirical tests of the theory's core claims. A commentary in the same issue by Alex Gomez-Marin and Anil Seth, titled "A science of consciousness beyond pseudo-science and pseudo-consciousness", argued that, despite current empirical limitations, IIT remains scientifically legitimate.

=== Criticism ===
Influential philosopher John Searle has given a critique of the theory saying "The theory implies panpsychism" and "The problem with panpsychism is not that it is false; it does not get up to the level of being false. It is strictly speaking meaningless because no clear notion has been given to the claim." Searle's take has itself been criticized by other philosophers for misunderstanding and misrepresenting a theory that may actually be resonant with his own ideas.

Theoretical computer scientist Scott Aaronson has criticized IIT by demonstrating through its own formulation that an inactive series of logic gates, arranged in the correct way, would not only be conscious but be "unboundedly more conscious than humans are." Tononi himself agrees with the assessment and argues that according to IIT, an even simpler arrangement of inactive logic gates, if large enough, would also be conscious. However he further argues that this is a strength of IIT rather than a weakness, because that's exactly the sort of cytoarchitecture followed by large portions of the cerebral cortex, specially at the back of the brain, which is the most likely neuroanatomical correlate of consciousness according to some reviews.

Philosopher Tim Bayne has criticized the axiomatic foundations of the theory. He concludes that "the so-called 'axioms' that Tononi et al. appeal to fail to qualify as genuine axioms".

Adrien Doerig, Aaron Schurger, Kathryn Hess and Michael H. Herzog criticized IIT as either being "false or outside the realm of science" as recurrent neural networks and feedfoward neural networks are both universal function approximators. The function of a recurrent network with a high Φ can be recreated exactly with a feedforward network where Φ equals zero. Therefore empirical evidence cannot determine whether systems with high Φ are conscious, making IIT unfalsifiable. If feedwork networks with a Φ of zero are admitted to be conscious then IIT is falsified.

IIT has also been denounced by other members of the consciousness field as requiring "an unscientific leap of faith". The theory has also been derided for failing to answer the basic questions required of a theory of consciousness. Philosopher Adam Pautz says "As long as proponents of IIT do not address these questions, they have not put a clear theory on the table that can be evaluated as true or false." Neuroscientist Michael Graziano, proponent of the competing attention schema theory, rejects IIT as pseudoscience. He claims IIT is a "magicalist theory" that has "no chance of scientific success or understanding". Similarly, IIT was criticized that its claims are "not scientifically established or testable at the moment".

Neuroscientists Björn Merker, David Rudrauf and Philosopher Kenneth Williford co-authored a paper criticizing IIT on several grounds. Firstly, by not demonstrating that all members of systems which do in fact combine integration and differentiation in the formal IIT sense are conscious, systems which demonstrate high levels of integration and differentiation of information might provide the necessary conditions for consciousness but those combinations of attributes do not amount to the conditions for consciousness. Secondly that the measure, Φ, reflects efficiency of global information transfer rather than level of consciousness, and that the correlation of Φ with level of consciousness through different states of wakefulness (e.g. awake, dreaming and dreamless sleep, anesthesia, seizures and coma) actually reflect the level of efficient network interactions performed for cortical engagement. Hence Φ reflects network efficiency rather than consciousness, which would be one of the functions served by cortical network efficiency.

Computer scientist Robert J. Marks II has further argued the computational problems with Φ as IIT's measure of complexity, stating that "there are significant computational barriers to calculating Φ, the measure of high complexity used in IIT. IIT requires examining the KL divergence of all bifurcations of a system to calculate Φ. This number grows so quickly with respect to the number of states that calculating Φ becomes computationally prohibitive."

A letter published on 15 September 2023 in the preprint repository PsyArXiv and signed by 124 scholars asserted that until IIT is empirically testable, it should be labeled pseudoscience. A number of researchers defended the theory in response. An anonymized public survey invited all authors from peer-reviewed papers published between 2013 and 2023 found by a query of Web of Science using "consciousness AND theor*". Of the 60 respondents, 8% "fully" agreed, and 20% did "not at all" agree with the letter, with the remainder falling in between these poles.

The 10 March 2025 Nature Neuroscience commentary "What Makes a Theory of Consciousness Unscientific?" was signed by many of the same writers as the letter. It asserts that "the core ideas of IIT lack empirical support and are metaphysical, and not scientific" and refers to "the core claims of IIT, which we argue are unscientific". In a March 2025 Nature Neuroscience commentary, Giulio Tononi and colleagues responded to these criticisms, arguing that IIT is a scientific theory that makes falsifiable predictions and listing peer-reviewed studies presented as empirical tests of its core claims.

== See also ==
- Causality
- Consciousness
- Global workspace theory
- Hard problem of consciousness
- Mind–body problem
- Neural correlates of consciousness
- Phenomenology (philosophy)
- Phenomenology (psychology)
- Philosophy of mind
- Qualia
- Sentience
