= Perturbational Complexity Index =

Measure of the level of consciousness

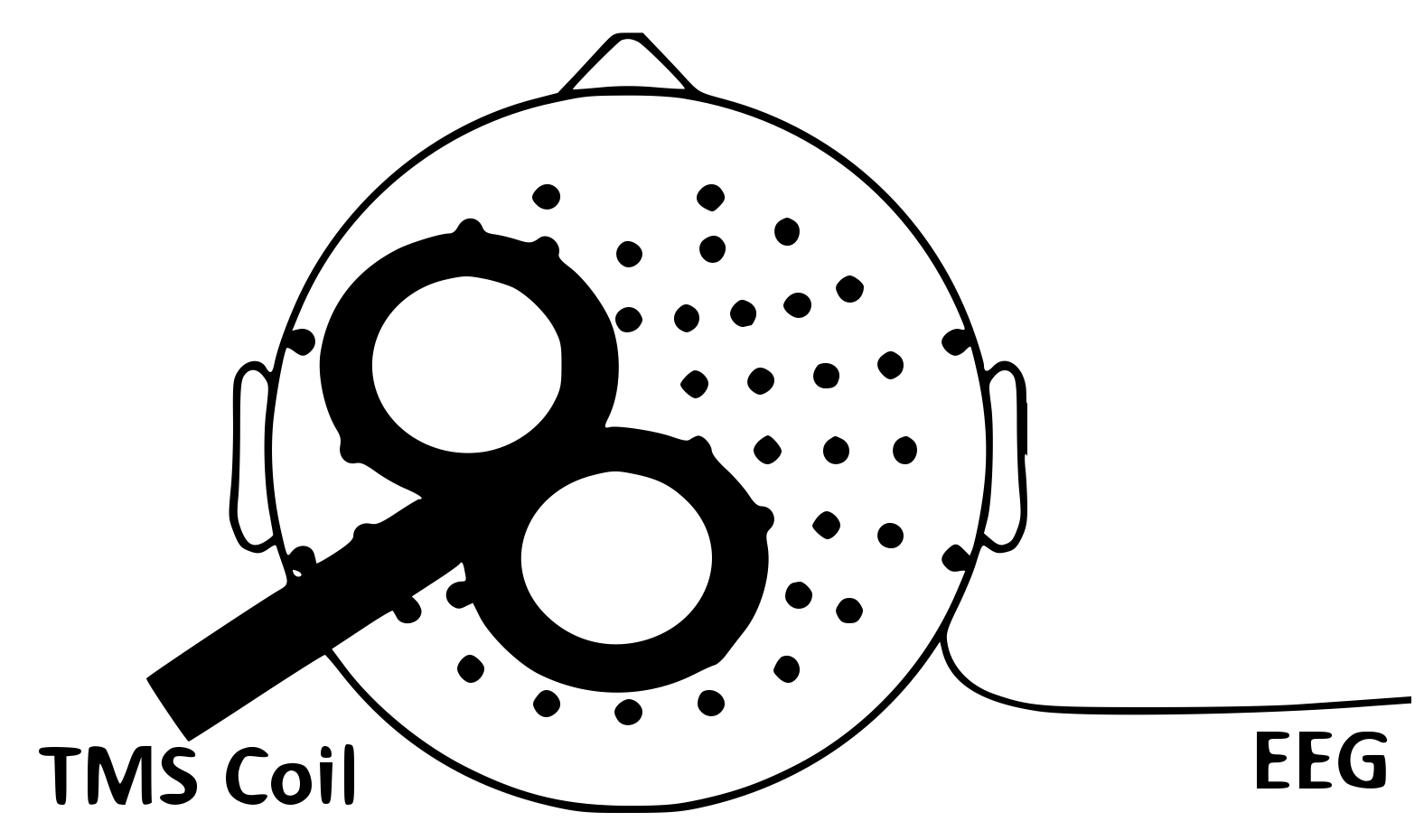
Schematic of combined transcranial magnetic stimulation (TMS) and electroencephalography (EEG). To compute the perturbational complexity index (PCI), brain activity is recorded before and after a TMS pulse to assess the brain's response to perturbation. Adapted from Chowdhury et al., eLife, 2023.

Perturbational Complexity Index (PCI) is a quantitative measure used in neuroscience to assess the level of consciousness based on the complexity of brain responses to external perturbations, typically induced via transcranial magnetic stimulation (TMS). It was introduced in 2013 by Italian M.D.–Ph.D. Marcello Massimini and colleagues as a practical application of principles from Integrated Information Theory (IIT), which posits that conscious systems must exhibit both high integration and differentiation of information.

== Concept ==
PCI quantifies the algorithmic complexity of the brain's response to a controlled perturbation. In a typical protocol, a combined TMS-EEG paradigm is used. A brief TMS pulse is delivered to the cortex, and the resulting electrical activity is recorded with electroencephalography (EEG). The recorded spatiotemporal EEG response is then binarized and compressed using a lossless algorithm to estimate its algorithmic complexity. The PCI value is normalized to control for signal length and amplitude.

Formally, PCI is defined as the normalized Lempel–Ziv complexity of the binarized EEG response:

$$\text{PCI} = \frac{C(S)}{N}$$,

where, $S$ is the spatiotemporal matrix of EEG responses to TMS, $C(S)$ denotes its Lempel–Ziv complexity, and $N$ is a normalization constant (typically sequence length). This formalization captures both the integration (distributed activation) and differentiation (structured diversity) of cortical responses.

Higher PCI values correspond to rich and differentiated responses, suggesting conscious states. Lower PCI values reflect stereotyped or globally synchronized responses, typically associated with unconscious states like deep sleep, general anesthesia, or coma.

== Clinical and scientific applications ==
PCI has been used to objectively differentiate among various states of consciousness, including:

- Wakefulness
- REM sleep
- Non-REM sleep
- General anesthesia
- Vegetative state / Unresponsive Wakefulness Syndrome (VS/UWS)
- Minimally conscious state (MCS)
- Locked-in syndrome

Its most notable clinical use is in the diagnosis and prognosis of disorders of consciousness (DoC), where behavioral assessments may be unreliable.

== Relation to Integrated Information Theory ==
Although PCI was inspired by IIT, it is not a direct measure of IIT's formal quantity Φ (phi). Rather, it is considered a proxy that empirically captures the principles of information integration and differentiation using experimentally accessible brain data.

== Variants and developments ==
Several adaptations of PCI have been proposed, including:

- PCI_{st} (State‑Transition) – A streamlined version based on state‑transition analysis rather than full Lempel–Ziv compression. PCI_{st} yields similar diagnostic and prognostic power in disorders of consciousness while being significantly faster to compute.
- Regional PCI – A 2020 preprint by Caulfield et al. tested the reliability of PCI across three cortical targets (premotor, motor, parietal) using TMS‑EEG and found that motor and parietal stimulations offered the highest intra-subject reliability, recommending multiple-site acquisition with a regional focus.

== Whole Brain simulations ==
Some simulations of PCI include:

- Decrease in PCI under general anesthesia and deep sleep.

== Limitations ==
Some limitations of PCI include:

- The need for TMS-EEG equipment and technical expertise
- Sensitivity to preprocessing and binarization steps
- Focus on the level, not the content, of consciousness

== See also ==
- Integrated Information Theory
- Lempel–Ziv complexity
- Disorders of consciousness
- Transcranial magnetic stimulation
- Electroencephalography
