= Dehaene–Changeux model =

Theory of consciousness

The Dehaene–Changeux model (DCM), also known as the global neuronal workspace, or global cognitive workspace model, is a part of Bernard Baars's global workspace model for consciousness.

It is a computer model of the neural correlates of consciousness programmed as a neural network. It attempts to reproduce the swarm behaviour of the brain's higher cognitive functions such as consciousness, decision-making and the central executive functions. It was developed by cognitive neuroscientists Stanislas Dehaene and Jean-Pierre Changeux beginning in 1986. It has been used to provide a predictive framework to the study of inattentional blindness and the solving of the Tower of London test.

== History ==
The Dehaene–Changeux model was initially established as a spin glass neural network attempting to represent learning and to then provide a stepping stone towards artificial learning among other objectives. It would later be used to predict observable reaction times within the priming paradigm and in inattentional blindness.

== Structure ==
=== General structure ===
The Dehaene–Changeux model is a meta neural network (i.e. a network of neural networks) composed of a very large number of integrate-and-fire neurons programmed in either a stochastic or deterministic way. The neurons are organised in complex thalamo-cortical columns with long-range connexions and a critical role played by the interaction between von Economo's areas. Each thalamo-cortical column is composed of pyramidal cells and inhibitory interneurons receiving a long-distance excitatory neuromodulation which could represent noradrenergic input.

=== A swarm and a multi-agent system composed of neural networks ===
Among others Cohen & Hudson (2002) had already used "meta neural networks as intelligent agents for diagnosis". Similarly to Cohen & Hudson, Dehaene & Changeux have established their model as an interaction of meta-neural networks (thalamocortical columns) themselves programmed in the manner of a "hierarchy of neural networks that together act as an intelligent agent", in order to use them as a system composed of a large scale of inter-connected intelligent agents for predicting the self-organized behaviour of the neural correlates of consciousness. Jain et al. (2002) had already clearly identified spiking neurons as intelligent agents since the lower bound for computational power of networks of spiking neurons is the capacity to simulate in real-time for boolean-valued inputs any Turing machine. The DCM being composed of a very large number of interacting sub-networks which are themselves intelligent agents, it is formally a multi-agent system programmed as a swarm or neural networks and a fortiori of spiking neurons.

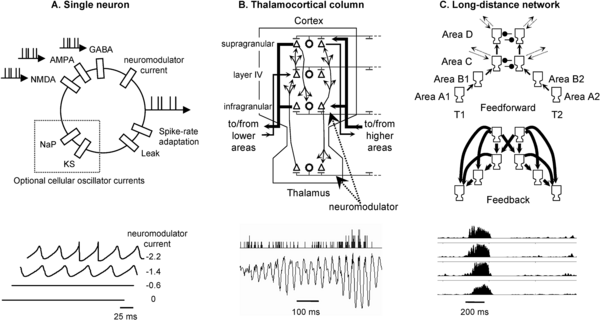
The three levels of complexity of the global workspace model: the integrate-and-fire neuron, the thalamo-cortical bundle and the long-range connexion. The authors provide the legend: "Shown are the constituents of the simulation (upper diagrams) and typical patterns of spontaneous activity that they can produce (lower tracings). We simulated a nested architecture in which spiking neurons (A) are incorporated within thalamocortical columns (B), which are themselves interconnected hierarchically by local and long-distance cortical connections (C) (see Materials and methods for details). While single neurons may generate sustained oscillations of membrane potentials (A), only the column and network levels generate complex waxing-and-waning EEG-like oscillations (B) and metastable global states of sustained firing (C)."

== Behavior ==
The DCM exhibits several subcritical emergent behaviors such as multistability and a Hopf bifurcation between two very different regimes which may represent either sleep or arousal with a various all-or-none behaviors which Dehaene et al. use to determine a testable taxonomy between different states of consciousness.

== Scholarly reception ==
=== Self-organized criticality ===
The Dehaene–Changeux model contributed to the study of nonlinearity and self-organized criticality in particular as an explanatory model of the brain's emergent behaviors, including consciousness. Studying the brain's phase-locking and large-scale synchronization, Kitzbichler et al. (2011a) confirmed that criticality is a property of human brain functional network organization at all frequency intervals in the brain's physiological bandwidth.

Furthermore, exploring the neural dynamics of cognitive efforts after, inter alia, the Dehaene–Changeux model, Kitzbichler et al. (2011b) demonstrated how cognitive effort breaks the modularity of mind to make human brain functional networks transiently adopt a more efficient but less economical configuration. Werner (2007a) used the Dehaene–Changeux global neuronal workspace to defend the use of statistical physics approaches for exploring phase transitions, scaling and universality properties of the so-called "Dynamic Core" of the brain, with relevance to the macroscopic electrical activity in EEG and EMG. Furthermore, building from the Dehaene–Changeux model, Werner (2007b) proposed that the application of the twin concepts of scaling and universality of the theory of non-equilibrium phase transitions can serve as an informative approach for elucidating the nature of underlying neural-mechanisms, with emphasis on the dynamics of recursively reentrant activity flow in intracortical and cortico-subcortical neuronal loops. Friston (2000) also claimed that "the nonlinear nature of asynchronous coupling enables the rich, context-sensitive interactions that characterize real brain dynamics, suggesting that it plays a role in functional integration that may be as important as synchronous interactions".

=== States of consciousness and phenomenology ===
It contributed to the study of phase transition in the brain under sedation, and notably GABA-ergic sedation such as that induced by propofol (Murphy et al. 2011, Stamatakis et al. 2010). The Dehaene–Changeux model was contrasted and cited in the study of collective consciousness and its pathologies (Wallace et al. 2007). Boly et al. (2007) used the model for a reverse somatotopic study, demonstrating a correlation between baseline brain activity and somatosensory perception in humans. Boly et al. (2008) also used the DCM in a study of the baseline state of consciousness of the human brain's default network.

=== Adversarial collaboration to test the Dehaene–Changeux model and integrated information theory ===
In 2019, the Templeton Foundation announced funding in excess of $6,000,000 to test opposing empirical predictions of Dehaene–Changeux model and a rival theory (integrated information theory, or IIT). The originators of both theories signed off on experimental protocols and data analyses as well as the exact conditions that satisfy if their championed theory correctly predicted the outcome or not. Initial results were revealed in June 2023. None of the Dehaene–Changeux model predictions passed what was agreed upon pre-registration while two out of three of IIT's predictions passed that threshold.

== Publications ==
- Rialle, V and Stip, E. (May 1994). "Cognitive modeling in psychiatry: from symbolic models to parallel and distributed models". J Psychiatry Neurosci. 19(3): 178–192.
- Zigmond, Michael J. (1999). Fundamental neuroscience. Academic Press, p1551.
- Dehaene, Stanislas (2001). The cognitive neuroscience of consciousness. MIT Press, p. 13.
- Ravi Prakash, Om Prakash, Shashi Prakash, Priyadarshi Abhishek, and Sachin Gandotra (2008). "Global workspace model of consciousness and its electromagnetic correlates". Ann Indian Acad Neurol. Jul–Sep; 11(3): 146–153. doi:10.4103/0972-2327.42933
- Gazzaniga, Michael S. (2004). The cognitive neurosciences. MIT Press, p. 1146.
- Laureys, Steven; et al. (2006). The boundaries of consciousness: neurobiology and neuropathology. Volume 150 of Progress in Brain Research. Elsevier, p. 45.
- Naccache, L. (March 2007). "Cognitive aging considered from the point of view of cognitive neurosciences of consciousness". Psychologie & NeuroPsychiatrie du vieillissement. Volume 5, Number 1, 17–21.
- Hans Liljenström, Peter Århem (2008). Consciousness transitions: phylogenetic, ontogenetic, and physiological aspects. Elsevier, p. 126.
- Tim Bayne, Axel Cleeremans, Patrick Wilken (2009). The Oxford companion to consciousness. Oxford University Press, p. 332.
- Bernard J. Baars, Nicole M. Gage (2010). Cognition, brain, and consciousness: introduction to cognitive neuroscience. Academic Press, p. 287.
- Carlos Hernández, Ricardo Sanz, Jaime Gómez-Ramirez, Leslie S. Smith, Amir Hussain, Antonio Chella, Igor Aleksander (2011). From Brains to Systems: Brain-Inspired Cognitive Systems. Volume 718 of Advances in Experimental Medicine and Biology Series. Springer, p. 230.

== See also ==
- Artificial consciousness
- Complex system
- Neuroscience
