= Williford =

Williford may refer to:

- Williford (surname), Surname for the Williford family.
- Williford, Arkansas, a town in Sharp County, Arkansas
- Williford, Florida, an unincorporated community in Gilchrist County, Florida
