= Catalina Curceanu =

Romanian physicist

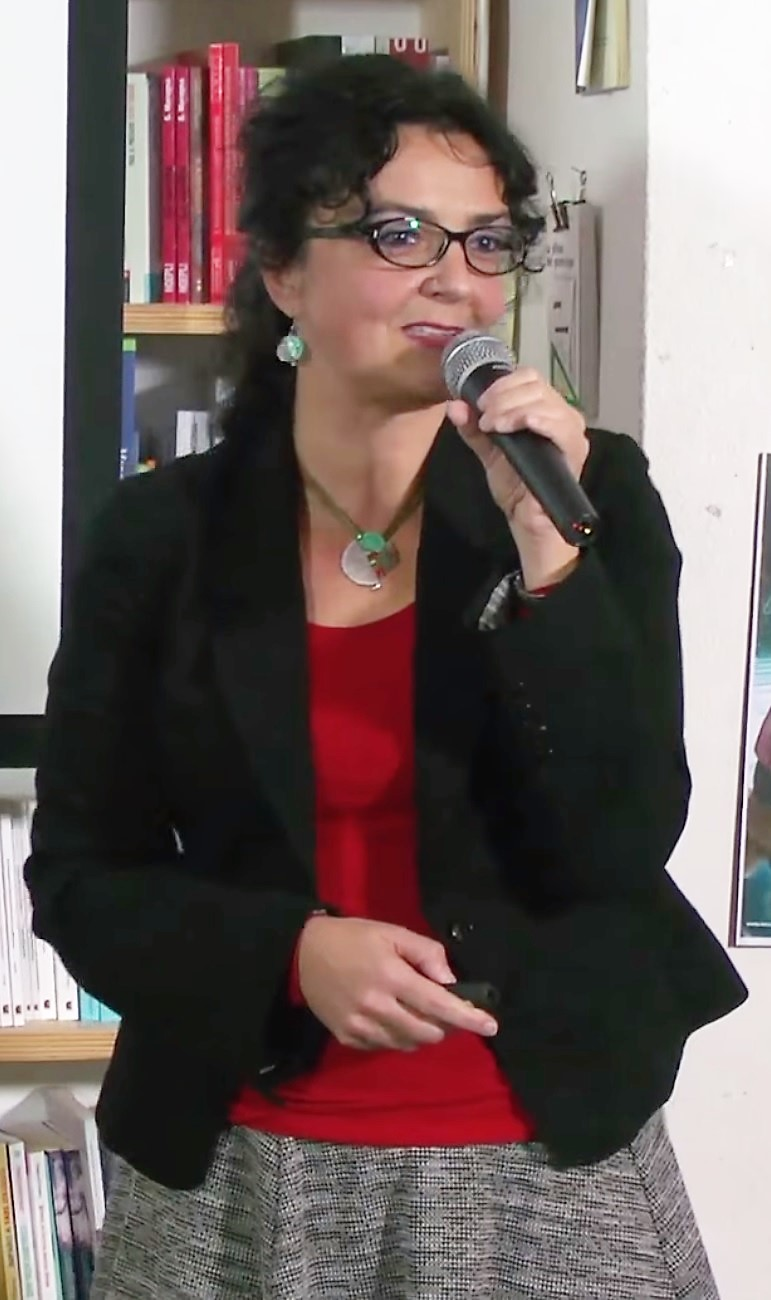
- Curceanu speaking at the Libreria Assaggi in 2015
- Education: University of Bucharest; CERN
- Scientific career
- Workplaces: Istituto Nazionale di Fisica Nucleare

Cătălina Oana Curceanu is a Romanian physicist and lead researcher at the Istituto Nazionale di Fisica Nucleare. She researches low energy quantum chromodynamics.

== Early life and education ==
Curceanu was born in Transylvania. She became interested in science as a child, and applied to the Mathematics and Physics Lyceum at Magurele in Bucharest. She attributes her passion for physics to her very skilled teachers. She studied physics at the University of Bucharest and graduated as a Valedictorian. She carried out her doctoral research using the Low Energy Antiproton Ring at CERN on the OBELIX experiment. She earned her PhD from the Horia Hulubei National Institute of Physics and Nuclear Engineering.

== Research and career ==
In 1992 Curceanu joined the Istituto Nazionale di Fisica Nucleare. She uses the DAFNE (DAΦNE) collider at Frascati. She is part of the VIP2 experiment (Violation of the Pauli Principle) in the Laboratori Nazionali del Gran Sasso. In 2010 she was awarded Personality of the Year by the Romanian Academy in Rome. She works at CERN on the OBELIX experiment, looking for Exotic mesons, and DIRAC, looking for exotic pionium.

Interview by Alessandra de Vitis (WikiDonne) with the researcher of the National Institute of Nuclear Physics in Frascati, Cătălina Curceanu (in Italian)

She published the popular science book Dai Buchi Neri all'adroterapia. Un Viaggio nella Fisica Moderna in 2013 with Springer. The book considers concepts of modern physics, including; the standard model, black holes and neutrinos. In 2015 she was awarded a $85,000 grant from FQXI and the John Templeton Foundations for her quantum physics research. Her proposal considered collapse models and the measurement problem. She used an ultrapure germanium detector to test the radiation it emits. Her recent work involves the SIDDHARTA experiment, looking at the strong interaction and strangeness.

Curceanu was the Australian Institute of Physics Women in Physics lecturer in 2016. In her lectures she asked "Quo Vadis the Universe'". She has spoken about quantum computers at TEDx Brașov and TEDx Cluj-Napoca. She won the 2017 European Physical Society Emmy Noether Distinction for Women in Physics for her contributions to low-energy QCD. She won a Visiting International Scholar Award from the University of Wollongong in 2017, researching detector systems for high precision spectroscopy in fundamental physics. She is involved with several outreach and education activities.
