= Williford (surname) =

Williford is a surname. Notable people with the surname include:

- Kenneth Williford (born 1972), American philosopher
- Kelly Williford (born 1994), American born-Dominican female tennis player
- Steven Williford (fl. 2010), American television director
