= Giulio Tononi =

Italian neuroscientist, psychiatrist, and professor (born 1960)

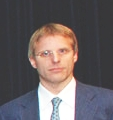
- Born: 1960 (age 65–66); Trento, Italy
- Education: Sant'Anna School of Advanced Studies
- Known for: Sleep research, integrated information theory, consciousness studies
- Awards: NIH Director's Pioneer award (2005)
- Scientific career
- Fields: Psychology, neuroscience
- Workplaces: University of Wisconsin-Madison; University of Pisa; University of California at San Diego
- Notable students: Erik Hoel

Giulio Tononi (Italian: [ˈdʒuːljo toˈnoːni]) is a neuroscientist and psychiatrist who holds the David P. White Chair in Sleep Medicine, as well as a Distinguished Chair in Consciousness Science, at the University of Wisconsin-Madison. He is best known for his Integrated Information Theory (IIT), a mathematical theory of consciousness, which he proposed in 2004.

== Biography ==
Tononi was born in Trento, Italy, and obtained an M.D. in psychiatry and a Ph.D. in neurobiology at the Sant'Anna School of Advanced Studies in Pisa, Italy.

He is an authority on sleep, and in particular the genetics and etiology of sleep. Tononi and collaborators have pioneered several complementary approaches to study sleep:

- genomics
- proteomics
- fruit fly models
- rodent models employing multiunit / local field potential recordings in behaving animals
- in vivo voltammetry and microscopy
- high-density EEG recordings and transcranial magnetic stimulation (TMS) in humans
- large-scale computer models of sleep and wakefulness

This research has led to a comprehensive hypothesis on the function of sleep (proposed with sleep researcher Chiara Cirelli), the synaptic homeostasis hypothesis. According to the hypothesis, wakefulness leads to a net increase in synaptic strength, and sleep is necessary to reestablish synaptic homeostasis. The hypothesis has implications for understanding the effects of sleep deprivation and for developing novel diagnostic and therapeutic approaches to sleep disorders and neuropsychiatric disorders.

Tononi is a leader in the field of consciousness studies, and has co-authored a book on the subject with Nobel prize winner Gerald Edelman.

Tononi also developed the integrated information theory (IIT): a theory of what consciousness is, how it can be measured, how it is correlated with brain states, and why it fades when we fall into dreamless sleep and returns when we dream. The theory is being tested with neuroimaging, Transcranial magnetic stimulation (TMS), and computer models. His work has been described as "the only really promising fundamental theory of consciousness" by collaborator Christof Koch.

== Works ==
- Massimini, M.; Tononi, G. (2018). Sizing up Consciousness: Towards an Objective Measure of the Capacity for Experience. Oxford University Press. ISBN 978-0-19-872844-3.
- Tononi, G. (2012). PHI: A Voyage from the Brain to the Soul. Pantheon Books.
- Laureys, S.; Tononi, G. (2009). The Neurology of Consciousness: Cognitive Neuroscience and Neuropathology. Academic Press.
- Tononi, G. (2003). Galileo e il fotodiodo. Laterza (Bari).
- Edelman, G.M.; Tononi, G. (2000). A Universe of Consciousness: How Matter Becomes Imagination. Basic Books.
- Sporns, O.; Tononi, G. (1994). Selectionism and the Brain. Academic Press.
