= VIP2 experiment =

Coordinates: 42.454°N 13.576°E

The VIP2 experiment (Violation of the Pauli Principle) is an atomic physics experiment studying the possible violation of the Pauli exclusion principle for electrons. The experiment is located in the underground laboratory of Gran Sasso, LNGS-INFN, near the town L'Aquila in Italy. It is run by an international collaboration of researchers from Austria, Italy, France and Romania. The sources for funding include the INFN (Italy), the Austrian Science Fund and the John Templeton Foundation (JTF). Within the JTF project, also the implications for physics, cosmology and philosophy are being investigated.

== Principle of the experiment ==
The different approaches to investigate the Pauli exclusion principle need to be distinguished concerning their possible fulfillment of the Messiah–Greenberg superselection rule. This rule states that the symmetry of the wave function of a steady state is constant in time. As a consequence, the symmetry of a quantum state can only change if a particle, which is new to the system, interacts with the state.

One way to fulfill this rule and test the Pauli exclusion principle with high precision is to introduce "new" electrons in a conductor. The electrons form new quantum states with the atoms in the conductor. These "new" states could violate the Pauli exclusion principle. The aim of VIP2 is to search for new quantum states, which have a symmetric component in an otherwise antisymmetric state. These non-Paulian states can be identified by the characteristic X-rays emitted during Pauli exclusion principle—prohibited atomic transitions to the ground state. An example for a transition of this kind would be a third electron arriving on the 1s level. The emitted X-rays are detected by silicon drift detectors.

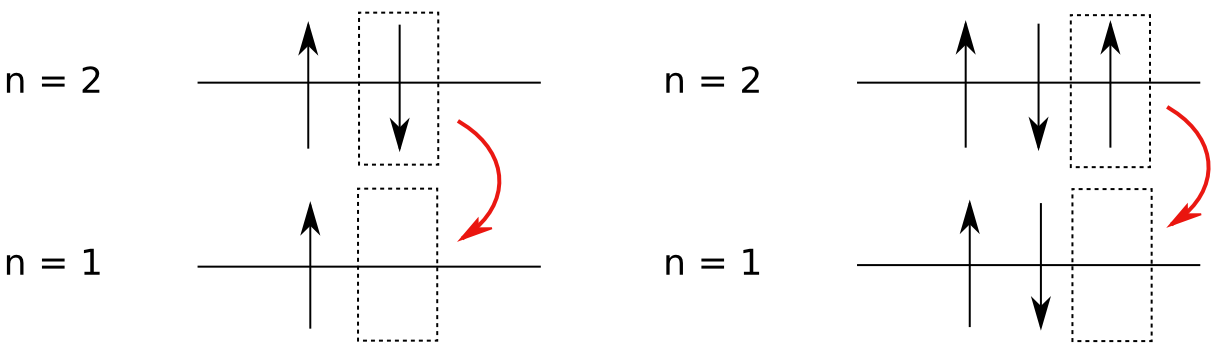
Comparison of normal (left) and non-Paulian (right) atomic 2p to 1s transitions.

The energies of the transitions between Pauli-forbidden states were calculated using a multi-configuration Dirac–Fock method and they differ slightly from the corresponding normal transition. For example, the Pauli-forbidden K-alpha transition in copper, which is used in VIP2, where 2 electrons are in the 1s orbital before the transition happens, is shifted by 300 eV to lower energies with respect to the normal transition.

VIP2 runs at LNGS, where the background radiation introduced by cosmic rays is strongly reduced. Data are taken in alternating runs without current (background) and in runs with current (signal). By analysing the detected energy spectra in the region where Pauli exclusion principle violating transitions are expected, upper limits on the probability for a violation of the Pauli exclusion principle are obtained.

== Results ==
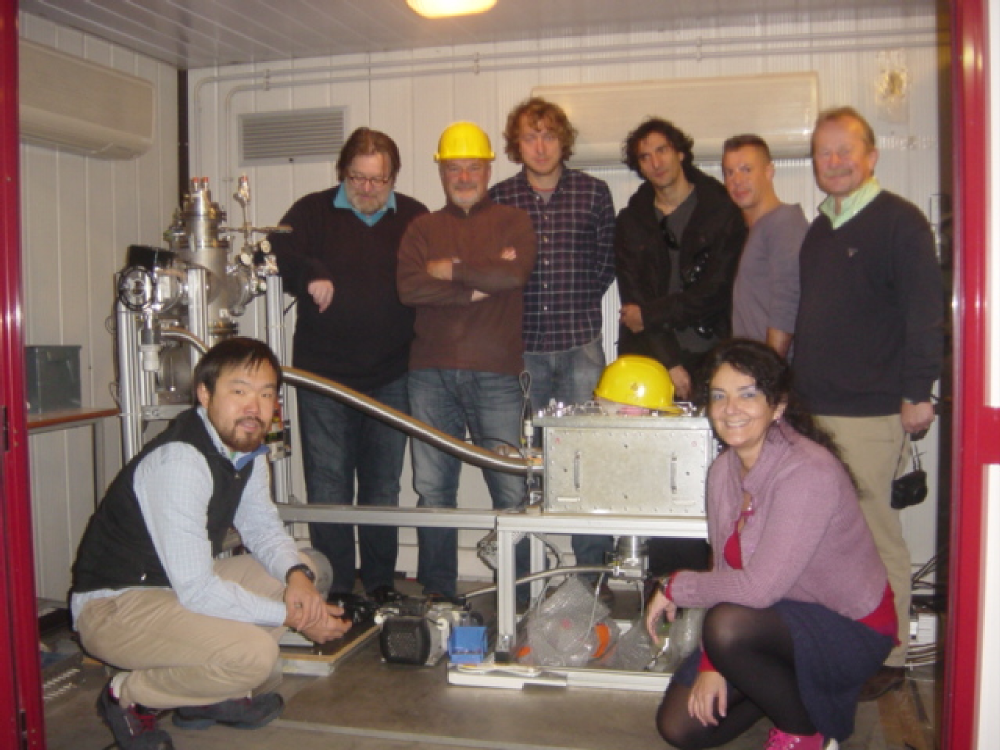
VIP collaboration group picture at the experiment site at LNGS in November 2015.

The experiment is taking data in stable conditions since summer 2016 in the Gran Sasso underground laboratory. With the data taken until the end of 2020, an intermediate upper limit can be set for the probability that the Pauli exclusion principle is violated in an atom of

$$p(\text{violation}) < 8.6 \times 10^{-31}.$$

The VIP-2 experiment is in 2023 in its last year of operation. A major upgrade is on the way, which will be characterized by a larger vacuum chamber allowing stronger current, and thicker silicon drift detectors, allowing a higher efficiency of X-rays detection and sensitivity to Pauli-forbidden transitions in heavier elements.
