= Donna Hudson =

American biomedical engineer

Donna Lee Hudson (born 1946) is an American biomedical engineer known for her research on expert systems for medical diagnosis and on the application of chaos theory to heart rhythms. She is a professor emerita at the University of California, San Francisco.

== Education and career ==
Hudson majored in mathematics at California State University, Fresno, graduating in 1968 and began working for Boeing, on computational problems involving wind tunnels. She returned to CSU Fresno for a master's degree in mathematics, which she earned in 1972. In 1975, as a graduate student in engineering and computer science at the University of California, Los Angeles, she began working as an instructor at CSU Fresno. She completed her Ph.D. in 1981, and after completing her Ph.D. took a faculty position at the University of California, San Francisco, affiliated with the Fresno branch campus of the university and with its clinical and translational informatics and bioengineering programs.

Hudson was president of the IEEE Engineering in Medicine and Biology Society for 2007–2008 and president of the International Society for Computers and Their Applications for 1999–2001.

== Book ==
With Maurice E. Cohen, Hudson is the author of the book Neural Networks and Artificial Intelligence for Biomedical Engineering (Wiley/IEEE Press, 1999).

== Recognition ==
Hudson was named a Fellow of the American Institute for Medical and Biological Engineering in 1995, and a Fellow of the IEEE in 2001, "for contributions to the development of techniques for computer-assisted medical decision making". In 2003, the CSU Fresno College of Science and Mathematics named her as Alumnus of the Year.
