= Kenneth Williford =

American philosopher (born 1972)

- Born: 1972 (age 53–54); Ft. Worth, Texas

Education
- Education: Martin High School, University of Texas at Arlington (BA), University of Iowa (MA, PhD)

Philosophical work
- Era: 21st-century philosophy
- Region: Western philosophy
- Institutions: University of Texas at Arlington (2009-), University of Iowa, St. Cloud State University, Bielefeld University

Kenneth W. Williford (born 1972) is an American philosopher and Professor at the University of Texas at Arlington. He is known for his works on consciousness.

== Books ==
- Williford, K. (Ed.). (2023). Hume’s Dialogues Concerning Natural Religion: A Philosophical Appraisal. Routledge.
- Borner, M., Frank, M., & Williford, K. (Eds.). (2019). Senses of Self: Approaches to Pre-Reflective Self-Awareness (ProtoSociology Volume 36)
- Williford, K. W., Ryder, D., & Kingsbury, J. (Eds.). (2013). Ruth Millikan and her Critics. Wiley-Blackwell.
- Williford, K. W., & Kriegel, U. (Eds.) (2006). Self-Representational Approaches to Consciousness. MIT.
