= Quantum Night =

2016 Robert J. Sawyer novel

- First edition cover
- Author: Robert J. Sawyer
- Language: English
- Genre: Science fiction
- Published: Penguin Books (Canada); Ace Books (US)
- Publication date: 1 March 2016
- Publication place: Canada
- Media type: Print (Hardcover)
- Pages: 351
- ISBN: 9780425256831

Quantum Night is a 2016 science-fiction thriller novel written by Canadian novelist Robert J. Sawyer. Set in 2020, the book touches on themes of quantum physics, psychology, current politics and ethics.

== Plot ==
Professor Jim Marchuk is an experimental psychologist at the University of Manitoba and a subscriber to utilitarianism. He is asked to testify at the sentencing hearing of a convicted murderer in Atlanta, using his new technique for identifying psychopaths from lack of saccadic eye motion, which he claims outperforms the Hare checklist. While in the United States, he learns that the recently elected President Quentin Carroway has overturned Roe v. Wade and enacted several measures to reduce the rights of illegal immigrants. While being cross-examined in court, Jim is shocked to discover that he is missing six months of memory from early 2001.

Returning to Winnipeg, Jim consults with his colleague and mentor Menno Warkentin, whom he describes as an elderly professor who was blinded in a car accident. They attribute Jim's memory loss to the trauma of a stabbing at the hands of a stranger that Jim remembers from a New Year's Eve 2000 trip to visit his parents in Calgary. A physicist named Kayla Huron contacts Jim and informs him that her research is also related to psychopathy. As they agree to meet, Jim learns that Kayla is his former girlfriend from the lost period. Over dinner Kayla reveals that she ended their relationship because Jim was abusive towards her, but she believes that he has changed.

Kayla introduces Jim to her collaborator Victoria Chen at the Canadian Light Source (CLS) in Saskatoon. They use the beam to perform a measurement on Jim's brain cells and find that they have three microtubules in a quantum superposition. This is revealed to be part of a taxonomy which they call Q1-Q2-Q3: four-sevenths of all humans have one quantum microtubule in superposition, two-sevenths have two and one-seventh have three, with these numbers only changing as a result of a coma or general anaesthetic. By observing behavioural traits of their test subjects, Kayla and Victoria hypothesize that Q2s are psychopaths, while Q1s are philosophical zombies: non-conscious humans who lack free will and become susceptible to mob mentality. Only Q3s are seen as having critical thinking ability and empathy. Jim and Kayla become romantically involved once again, but Victoria breaks up with her boyfriend after the test identifies him as a Q1.

Meanwhile, Jim begins to reconstruct his past and discovers that his memory of being stabbed is a confabulation. He learns that, along with spending that New Year's Eve in Winnipeg, he participated in a Pentagon-funded study run by Menno and engineering professor Dominic Adler. The study, called Project Lucidity, aimed to create an EEG-like helmet to read articulated thoughts and aid battlefield communication. To overcome the 'background noise' of Jim's inner voice – his conscience – they accidentally caused him to enter a Q1 state during which his memories were indexed differently. Menno reveals that Jim returned to a fully conscious state six months later, and that he and Dominic decided to go their separate ways and maintained secrecy due to a non-disclosure agreement, moral issues due to Menno's Mennonite religion, and concerns that their research could be used to justify discrimination. As Jim continues therapy, he gains access to a memory from the end of his lost period when he had become psychopathic. He is shocked to learn that he killed Dominic in cold blood and blinded Menno before a laboratory device 'rebooted' him into a Q3 state.

As political tensions rise, a series of violent riots erupt across Canada, precipitated by a protest over the Winnipeg Jets' overtime loss in game seven of the Stanley Cup Final, and the Canadian government under new Prime Minister Naheed Nenshi struggles to restore order. Using the riots as an excuse, Carroway orders an American invasion of Canada. Russian President Vladimir Putin also makes plans to invade Canada, bringing the US and Russia to the brink of war. Jim uses his technique to show Carroway and Putin are psychopaths, and asks Kayla if they can be transitioned from Q2 to Q3, thus averting the crisis. Kayla says that the CLS running at full power can manipulate cranial superposition on a global scale, and that the best solution would be two reboots, resulting in the majority of humans fully conscious and empathetic. However, she refuses to help as she doesn't want her daughter Ryan to become a psychopath. Jim suspects that Kayla had been a psychopath before surgical anesthetic caused her consciousness to reboot; Kayla admits to this and explains it as the reason she has been studying psychopathy.

Jim enlists the help of Victoria, who had lied about Ryan's test and says that the reboots will raise Ryan from a Q1 to a Q3. Menno volunteers to sacrifice himself and keep the CLS running amid lethal doses of radiation. Before Kayla can stop them, the plan comes to fruition and the world enters a new age in which the majority of humans can feel empathy and remorse. As a Q2, Jim decides to have an affair with Victoria. However, Kayla perceives him as a threat and reboots him as a Q3 with Menno's device. Kayla and Victoria wish to remain in the Q2 state. Out of self-interest, Victoria erases their research and Kayla gives Jim custody of Ryan. Convinced of having made an unprecedented move for the greater good, Jim decides to connect with his estranged family.

== Major themes ==
Author Robert J. Sawyer keeps an updated list of all of his works and groups them among recurring themes. He self-identified Quantum Night as containing the following themes: the nature of consciousness, biology determining psychology, Canada, courtroom drama, parent-child relationships, psychotherapy/counseling/psychological testing, modern physics and the nature of reality.

== Development history ==
In an interview with SFFWorld, Sawyer described how he wrote the book. When asked if the characters or the story came first, Sawyer said, "Neither. I'm a thematically driven writer; I figure out what I want to say first and then devise the storyline and a cast of characters that will let me most effectively say it." The theme that drives Quantum Night is "the most pernicious lie humanity has ever told itself is that you can't change human nature." In the same interview Sawyer said, "I wanted to open people's eyes and have them look critically at social forces sweeping around them."

Sawyer includes a list of fifty-one non-fiction books in the back of the novel which he consulted while writing the novel. Books, articles and authors referenced.

Consciousness and quantum mechanics:

- The Emperor's New Mind: Concerning Computers, Minds, and the Laws of by Physics by Sir Roger Penrose
- Shadows of the Mind: A Search for the missing Science of Consciousness by Sir Roger Penrose
- Consciousness in the Universe: A Review of the 'Orch OR' Theory by Stuart Hameroff and Roger Penrose

Philosopher's zombies:

- The Conscious Mind: In Search of Fundamental Theory by David J. Chalmers
- Life on the Edge: The Coming Age of Quantum Biology by Johnjoe McFadden and Jim Al-Khalili
- The Character of Consciousness by David J. Chalmers
- The Authoritarians by Bob Altemeyer

Complex behavior:

- Power of Habit: Why We Do What We Do in Life by Charles Duhigg
- Gut Feelings: The Intelligence of the Unconscious by Gerd Gigerenzer
- The Self Illusion: How the Social Brain Creates Identity by Bruce Hood
- Consciousness: Confessions of a Romantic Reductionist by Christof Koch
- Social: Why Our Brains Are Wired to Connect by Matthew D. Lieberman
- The Smart Swarm: How Understanding Flocks, Schools, And Colonies Can Make Us Better at Communicating, Decision Making and Getting Things Done by Peter Miller
- Psychonomics: How Modern Science Aims to Conquer the Mind and How the Mind Prevails by Eric Robert Morse
- Wired for Culture: Origins of the Human Social Mind by Mark Pagel
- Social Physics: How Good Ideas Spread by Alex Pentland
- Autopilot: The Art and Science of Doing Nothing by Andrew Smart
- The Wisdom of Crowds by James Surowiecki
- The Social Conquest of the World by Edward O. Wilson
- Mirroring People: The Science of Empathy and How We Connect with Others by Marco Iacoboni
- The Myth of Mirror Neurons by Gregory Hickock

Psychopaths:

- The Mask of Sanity by Hervey Cleckley
- Without Conscience: The Disturbing World of the Psychopaths Among Us by Robert D. Hare
- The Psychopathic Whisperer: The Science of Those Without Conscience by Kent Kiehl
- The Psychopathic Test: A Journey Through the Madness Industry by Jon Ronson
- Snakes in Suits: When Psychopaths Go to Work by Paul Babiak and Robert D. Hare
- The Sociopath Next Door by Martha Stout
- The Wisdom of Psychopaths: What Saints, Spies, Serial Killers Can Teach Us About Success by Kevin Dutton
- The Psychopath Inside: A Neuroscientist's Personal Journey into the Dark Side of the Brain by James Fallon
- Women Who Love Psychopaths by Sandra L. Brown

Milgram experiment:

- Obedience to Authority by Stanley Milgram
- The Man Who Shocked the World: The Life and Legacy of Stanley Milgram by Thomas Blass
- Behind the Shock Machine: the Untold Story of the Notorious Milgram Psychology Experiments by Gina Perry

Stanford Prison Guard Experiment:

- The Lucifer Effect: Understanding How Good People Turn Evil by Philip Zimbardo
- Eichmann in Jerusalem: A Report on the Banality of Evil by Hannah Arendt

Human Evil:

- Hitler's Charisma by Laurence Rees
- Conservatives Without Conscience by John W. Dean
- Evil: Inside Human Violence and Cruelty by Roy F. Baumeister
- The Science of Evil: On Empathy and the Origins of Cruelty by Simon Baron-Cohen
- Just Babies: The Origins of Good and Evil by Paul Bloom

Utilitarianism:

- Practical Ethics, Third Edition by Peter Singer
- Writings on an Ethical Life by Peter Singer
- The Life You Can Save: Acting Now to End World Poverty by Peter Singer
- Animal Liberation: A New Ethics for Our Treatment of Animals by Peter Singer
- Moral Tribes: Emotion, Reason, and the Gap Between Us and Them by Joshua Greene

Ethics and Free Will

- The Trolley Problem: Or Would You Throw the Fat Guy Off the Bridge? by Thomas Cathcart
- Brain Trust: What Neuroscience Tells Us About Morality by Patricia S. Churchland
- Who's in Charge? Free Will and the Science of the Brain by Michael Gazzaniga
- Free Will by Sam Harris
- The Storytelling Animal: How Stories Make Us Human by Jonathan Gottschall
- Homo Narrans: The Poetics and Anthropology of Oral Literature by John D. Niles

Scientific basis for creation of literature and art:

- Mimesis and the Human Animal: On the Biogenetic Foundations of Literary Representation by Robert Storey

=== Publication history ===
2015, US, Ace ISBN 9780425256831, 1 March 2016, Hardcover

=== Explanation of the novel's title ===
The title refers to "it's always darkest before the dawn." Sawyer wanted to write a book that addressed the dark side of human nature and the negative forces and outright evil in the 21st century world and he wanted the title to reflect that.

== Reception ==
Quantum Night has received positive reviews. Publishers Weekly called it a "fast-moving, mind-stretching exploration of the nature of personality and consciousness." Winnipeg Free Press described the book "a breath of fresh air and a return to classic Sawyer: big ideas, relatable people and a Canadian perspective."
