= Penrose–Lucas argument =

Claim that human mathematicians are not describable as formal proof systems

The Penrose–Lucas argument is a logical argument partially based on Kurt Gödel's first incompleteness theorem. In 1931, Gödel proved that every effectively generated theory capable of proving basic arithmetic either fails to be consistent or fails to be complete. John Lucas and Roger Penrose postulate that this incompleteness does not apply to humans, and conclude that humans can have mathematical insights that Turing machines can't. Penrose and Stuart Hameroff proposed a quantum explanation, and used it to provide the basis of their theory of consciousness: orchestrated objective reduction. The argument is rejected by most scholars.

== Background ==
Gödel's first incompleteness theorem shows that for any consistent formal system $F$ that allows certain arithmetic operations, there are statements of the language $F$ that cannot be proved or disproved. Thus, $F$ is either incomplete or inconsistent. A key element of the proof is the use of Gödel numbering to construct a "Gödel sentence" for the theory, which encodes a statement of its own incompleteness: "This theory can't prove this statement"; or "I am not provable in this system". Either this statement and its negation are both unprovable (the theory is incomplete) or both provable (the theory is inconsistent). In the first eventuality the statement is intuitively true (since it is not provable); otherwise, the statement is intuitively false - though provable.

According to proponents of the Penrose–Lucas argument, there is a disjunction: either the human mind is not a computation of a Turing machine, and thus not an effective procedure; or it is a product of an inconsistent Turing Machine that could be reasoning using some sort of paraconsistent logic. Gödel himself commented about this disjunction in 1953.

Penrose argued that while a formal proof system cannot prove its own consistency, Gödel-unprovable results are provable by human mathematicians. He takes this disparity to mean that human mathematicians are not describable as formal proof systems (which theorems can be proved using an abstract object such as a computer), and are therefore running a non-computable process. The argument was originally considered and dismissed by Turing in the late 1940s. It was espoused by Gödel himself in his 1951 Gibbs lecture, by E. Nagel and J.R. Newman in 1958, and was subsequently popularized by the philosopher John Lucas of Merton College, Oxford in 1961.

The inescapable conclusion seems to be: Mathematicians are not using a knowably sound calculation procedure in order to ascertain mathematical truth. We deduce that mathematical understanding – the means whereby mathematicians arrive at their conclusions with respect to mathematical truth – cannot be reduced to blind calculation!

— Roger Penrose

== Consequences ==
If correct, the Penrose–Lucas argument creates a need to understand the physical basis of non-computable behaviour in the brain. Most physical laws are computable, and thus algorithmic. However, Penrose determined that wave function collapse was a prime candidate for a non-computable process.

In quantum mechanics, particles are treated differently from the objects of classical mechanics. Particles are described by wave functions that evolve according to the Schrödinger equation. Non-stationary wave functions are linear combinations of the eigenstates of the system, a phenomenon described by the superposition principle. When a quantum system interacts with a classical system—i.e. when an observable is measured—the system appears to collapse to a random eigenstate of that observable from a classical vantage point.

If collapse is truly random, then no process or algorithm can deterministically predict its outcome. This provided Penrose with a candidate for the physical basis of the non-computable process that he hypothesized to exist in the brain. However, he disliked the random nature of environmentally induced collapse, as randomness was not a promising basis for mathematical understanding. Penrose proposed that isolated systems may still undergo a new form of wave function collapse, which he called objective reduction (OR).

Penrose sought to reconcile general relativity and quantum theory using his own ideas about the possible structure of spacetime. He suggested that spacetime is not continuous at the Planck scale, but discrete. Penrose postulated that each separated quantum superposition has its own piece of spacetime curvature, a blister in spacetime. Penrose suggests that gravity exerts a force on these spacetime blisters, which become unstable above the Planck scale of $10^{-35} \text{m}$ and collapse to just one of the possible states. The rough threshold for OR is given by Penrose's indeterminacy principle:

$$\tau \approx \hbar/E_G$$

where:

- $\tau$ is the time until OR occurs,
- $E_G$ is the gravitational self-energy or the degree of spacetime separation given by the superpositioned mass, and
- $\hbar$ is the reduced Planck constant.

Thus, the greater the mass-energy of the object, the faster it will undergo OR and vice versa. Atomic-level superpositions would require 10 million years to reach OR threshold, while an isolated 1 kilogram object would reach OR threshold in 10^{−37}s. Objects somewhere between these two scales could collapse on a timescale relevant to neural processing.

An essential feature of Penrose's theory is that the choice of states when objective reduction occurs is selected neither randomly (as are choices following wave function collapse) nor algorithmically. Rather, states are selected by a "non-computable" influence embedded in the Planck scale of spacetime geometry. Penrose claimed that such information is Platonic, representing pure mathematical truth, aesthetic and ethical values at the Planck scale. This relates to Penrose's ideas concerning the three worlds: physical, mental, and the Platonic mathematical world. In his theory, the Platonic world corresponds to the geometry of fundamental spacetime, which Penrose claims is the source of noncomputational thinking.

== Criticism ==
The Penrose–Lucas argument about the implications of Gödel's incompleteness theorem for computational theories of human intelligence was criticized by mathematicians, computer scientists, and philosophers, and the consensus among experts in these fields is that the argument fails, with different authors attacking different aspects of the argument.

Feferman criticized Penrose's arguments in Shadows of the Mind, maintaining that mathematicians do not progress by mechanistic search through proofs, but by trial-and-error reasoning, insight and inspiration. However, some artificial machines are also able to progress by using trial-and-error reasoning. He argued that everyday mathematics can be formalized, and rejected Penrose's Platonism.

LaForte pointed out that in order to know the truth of an unprovable Gödel sentence, one must already know the formal system is consistent. Referencing Benacerraf, he argues that humans cannot prove that they are consistent, and in all likelihood human brains are inconsistent algorithms that use some sort of paraconsistent logic, pointing to alleged contradictions within Penrose's own writings as examples. Stuart Russell and Peter Norvig similarly wrote that there is no proof that Gödel's incompleteness theorem does not apply to humans, and that the Penrose–Lucas argument rests on an "appeal to intuition that humans can somehow perform superhuman feats of mathematical insight". Similarly, Minsky argued that because humans can believe false ideas to be true, human mathematical understanding need not be consistent and consciousness may easily have a deterministic basis. Penrose argued against Minsky stating that mistakes human mathematicians make are irrelevant because they are correctable, while logical truths are “unassailable truths” to persons, which are the outputs of a sound system and the only ones that matter.

An analogous statement has been used to show that humans are subject to the same limits as machines: “Lucas cannot consistently assert this formula”. In defense of Lucas, J. E. Martin and K. H. Engleman argued in The Mind's I Has Two Eyes that Lucas can recognise that the sentence is true, as there's a point of view from which he can understand how the sentence tricks him. From this point of view Lucas can appreciate that he can't assert the sentence-and consequently he can recognise its truth.

Theodor Nenu argues that recent technological progress with respect to mathematical AI systems (for example AlphaGeometry) invites optimism regarding the future existence of mathematical chatbots which will be capable of having sophisticated discussions about advanced topics in mathematical logic (including Gödel’s incompleteness theorems). He claims that these hypothesised systems would easily pass what philosopher Peter Millican calls the Tutoring Test, which is a slight variation of the original Turing Test, where the main goal of the relevant AI system is to help its users understand an advanced academic topic (which is typically replete with intricate conceptual links). Nenu further maintains that passing the Tutoring Test for metamathematics, especially after sustained conversations with expert interlocutors that are well-versed in mathematical logic, entails genuine understanding of Gödelian phenomena. Nenu believes that when advanced mathematical chatbots will be around in the near future, it will be clear that the Lucas-Penrose argument rests on sleight of hand, even if the argument's precise point of failure is not explicitly revealed.

== See also ==
- Hypercomputation
- Orchestrated objective reduction
- Gödel's incompleteness theorems
- Logic
- Consistency
- Logical truth
- Quantum consciousness
- Mind
- Consciousness
- Hard problem of consciousness
- Qualia
- Reason

== Sources ==
- Hofstadter, Douglas (1979), Gödel, Escher, Bach: an Eternal Golden Braid
- Russell, Stuart J.; Norvig, Peter (2003), Artificial Intelligence: A Modern Approach (2nd ed.), Upper Saddle River, New Jersey: Prentice Hall, ISBN 0-13-790395-2
- Turing, Alan (October 1950). "Computing Machinery and Intelligence". Mind. 59 (236): 433–460. doi:10.1093/mind/LIX.236.433. ISSN 1460-2113. JSTOR 2251299. S2CID 14636783.
