= Quantum mind =

Fringe hypothesis

The quantum mind or quantum consciousness is a group of hypotheses proposing that local physical laws and interactions from classical mechanics or connections between neurons alone cannot explain consciousness. These hypotheses posit instead that quantum-mechanical phenomena, such as entanglement and superposition that cause nonlocalized quantum effects, interacting in smaller features of the brain than cells, may play an important part in the brain's function and could explain critical aspects of consciousness. These scientific hypotheses are as yet unvalidated, and they can overlap with quantum mysticism.

== History ==
Eugene Wigner developed the idea that quantum mechanics has something to do with the workings of the mind. He proposed that consciousness causes collapse, regarding the idea that the wave function collapses due to its interaction with consciousness. Freeman Dyson argued that "mind, as manifested by the capacity to make choices, is to some extent inherent in every electron".

Other contemporary physicists and philosophers considered these arguments unconvincing. Victor Stenger characterized quantum consciousness as a "myth" having "no scientific basis" that "should take its place along with gods, unicorns and dragons".

David Chalmers argues against quantum consciousness. He instead discusses how quantum mechanics may relate to dualistic consciousness. Chalmers is skeptical that any new physics can resolve the hard problem of consciousness. He argues that quantum theories of consciousness suffer from the same weakness as more conventional theories. Just as he argues that there is no particular reason why specific macroscopic physical features in the brain should give rise to consciousness, he also thinks that there is no specific reason why a particular quantum feature, such as the EM field in the brain, should give rise to consciousness either.

== Approaches ==
=== Bohm and Hiley ===
David Bohm viewed quantum theory and relativity as contradictory, which implied a more fundamental level in the universe. He claimed that both quantum theory and relativity pointed to this deeper theory, a quantum field theory. This more fundamental level was proposed to represent an undivided wholeness and an implicate order, from which arises the explicate order of the universe as we experience it.

Bohm's proposed order applies both to matter and consciousness. He suggested that it could explain the relationship between them. He saw mind and matter as projections into our explicate order from the underlying implicate order. Bohm claimed that when we look at matter, we see nothing that helps us to understand consciousness.

Bohm never proposed a specific means by which his proposal could be falsified, nor a neural mechanism through which his "implicate order" could emerge in a way relevant to consciousness. He later collaborated on Karl Pribram's holonomic brain theory as a model of quantum consciousness.

David Bohm also collaborated with Basil Hiley on work that claimed mind and matter both emerge from an "implicate order". Hiley in turn worked with philosopher Paavo Pylkkänen. According to Pylkkänen, Bohm's suggestion "leads naturally to the assumption that the physical correlate of the logical thinking process is at the classically describable level of the brain, while the basic thinking process is at the quantum-theoretically describable level".

=== Penrose and Hameroff ===
Theoretical physicist Roger Penrose and anaesthesiologist Stuart Hameroff collaborated to produce the theory known as "orchestrated objective reduction" (Orch-OR). Penrose and Hameroff initially developed their ideas separately and later collaborated to produce Orch-OR in the early 1990s. They reviewed and updated their theory in 2013.

Penrose's argument stemmed from Gödel's incompleteness theorems. In his first book on consciousness, The Emperor's New Mind (1989), he argued that while a formal system cannot prove its own consistency, Gödel's unprovable results are provable by human mathematicians. Penrose took this to mean that human mathematicians are not formal proof systems and not running a computable algorithm. According to Bringsjord and Xiao, this line of reasoning is based on fallacious equivocation on the meaning of computation. In the same book, Penrose wrote: "One might speculate, however, that somewhere deep in the brain, cells are to be found of single quantum sensitivity. If this proves to be the case, then quantum mechanics will be significantly involved in brain activity."

Penrose determined that wave function collapse was the only possible physical basis for a non-computable process. Dissatisfied with its randomness, he proposed a new form of wave function collapse that occurs in isolation and called it objective reduction. He suggested each quantum superposition has its own piece of spacetime curvature and that when these become separated by more than one Planck length, they become unstable and collapse. Penrose suggested that objective reduction represents neither randomness nor algorithmic processing but instead a non-computable influence in spacetime geometry from which mathematical understanding and, by later extension, consciousness derives.

Hameroff provided a hypothesis that microtubules would be suitable hosts for quantum behavior. Microtubules are composed of tubulin protein dimer subunits. The dimers each have hydrophobic pockets that are 8 nm apart and may contain delocalized π electrons. Tubulins have other smaller non-polar regions that contain π-electron-rich indole rings separated by about 2 nm. Hameroff proposed that these electrons are close enough to become entangled. He originally suggested that the tubulin-subunit electrons would form a Bose–Einstein condensate, but this was discredited. He then proposed a Frohlich condensate, a hypothetical coherent oscillation of dipolar molecules, but this too was experimentally discredited.

For instance, the proposed predominance of A-lattice microtubules, more suitable for information processing, was falsified by Kikkawa et al., who showed that all in vivo microtubules have a B lattice and a seam. Orch-OR predicted that microtubule coherence reaches the synapses through dendritic lamellar bodies (DLBs), but De Zeeuw et al. proved this impossible by showing that DLBs are micrometers away from gap junctions.

In 2014, Hameroff and Penrose claimed that the discovery of quantum vibrations in microtubules by Anirban Bandyopadhyay of the National Institute for Materials Science in Japan in March 2013 corroborates Orch-OR theory. Experiments that showed that anaesthetic drugs reduce how long microtubules can sustain suspected quantum excitations appear to support the quantum theory of consciousness.

In April 2022, the results of two related experiments at the University of Alberta and Princeton University were announced at The Science of Consciousness conference, providing further evidence to support quantum processes operating within microtubules. In a study Stuart Hameroff was part of, Jack Tuszyński of the University of Alberta demonstrated that anesthetics hasten the duration of a process called delayed luminescence, in which microtubules and tubulins re-emit trapped light. Tuszyński suspects that the phenomenon has a quantum origin, with superradiance being investigated as one possibility. In the second experiment, Gregory D. Scholes and Aarat Kalra of Princeton University used lasers to excite molecules within tubulins, causing a prolonged excitation to diffuse through microtubules further than expected, which did not occur when repeated under anesthesia. However, diffusion results have to be interpreted carefully, since even classical diffusion can be very complex due to the wide range of length scales in the fluid filled extracellular space. Nevertheless, University of Oxford quantum physicist Vlatko Vedral told that this connection with consciousness is a really long shot.

Also in 2022, a group of Italian physicists conducted several experiments that failed to provide evidence in support of a gravity-related quantum collapse model of consciousness, weakening the possibility of a quantum explanation for consciousness.

Although these theories are stated in a scientific framework, it is difficult to separate them from scientists' personal opinions. The opinions are often based on intuition or subjective ideas about the nature of consciousness. For example, Penrose wrote:

[M]y own point of view asserts that you can't even simulate conscious activity. What's going on in conscious thinking is something you couldn't properly imitate at all by computer.... If something behaves as though it's conscious, do you say it is conscious? People argue endlessly about that. Some people would say, "Well, you've got to take the operational viewpoint; we don't know what consciousness is. How do you judge whether a person is conscious or not? Only by the way they act. You apply the same criterion to a computer or a computer-controlled robot." Other people would say, "No, you can't say it feels something merely because it behaves as though it feels something." My view is different from both those views. The robot wouldn't even behave convincingly as though it was conscious unless it really was—which I say it couldn't be, if it's entirely computationally controlled.

Penrose continues:

A lot of what the brain does you could do on a computer. I'm not saying that all the brain's action is completely different from what you do on a computer. I am claiming that the actions of consciousness are something different. I'm not saying that consciousness is beyond physics, either—although I'm saying that it's beyond the physics we know now.... My claim is that there has to be something in physics that we don't yet understand, which is very important, and which is of a noncomputational character. It's not specific to our brains; it's out there, in the physical world. But it usually plays a totally insignificant role. It would have to be in the bridge between quantum and classical levels of behavior—that is, where quantum measurement comes in.

=== Umezawa, Vitiello, Freeman ===
Hiroomi Umezawa and collaborators proposed a quantum field theory of memory storage. Giuseppe Vitiello and Walter Freeman proposed a dialog model of the mind. This dialog takes place between the classical and the quantum parts of the brain. Their quantum field theory models of brain dynamics are fundamentally different from the Penrose–Hameroff theory.

==== Quantum brain dynamics ====
As described by Harald Atmanspacher, "Since quantum theory is the most fundamental theory of matter that is currently available, it is a legitimate question to ask whether quantum theory can help us to understand consciousness."

The original motivation in the early 20th century for relating quantum theory to consciousness was essentially philosophical. It is fairly plausible that conscious free decisions ("free will") are problematic in a perfectly deterministic world, so quantum randomness might indeed open up novel possibilities for free will. (On the other hand, randomness is problematic for goal-directed volition!)

Ricciardi and Umezawa proposed in 1967 a general theory of quanta of long-range coherent waves within and between brain cells, and showed a possible mechanism of memory storage and retrieval in terms of Nambu–Goldstone bosons. Mari Jibu and Kunio Yasue later popularized these results under the name "quantum brain dynamics" (QBD) as the hypothesis to explain the function of the brain within the framework of quantum field theory with implications on consciousness.

=== Pribram ===
Karl Pribram's holonomic brain theory (quantum holography) invoked quantum field theory to explain higher-order processing of memory in the brain. He argued that his holonomic model solved the binding problem. Pribram collaborated with Bohm in his work on quantum approaches to the thought process. Pribram suggested much of the processing in the brain was done in distributed fashion. He proposed that the fine fibered, felt-like dendritic fields might follow the principles of quantum field theory when storing and retrieving long term memory.

=== Stapp ===
Henry Stapp proposed that quantum waves are reduced only when they interact with consciousness. He argues from the quantum mechanics of John von Neumann (Mathematical Foundations of Quantum Mechanics) that the quantum state collapses when the observer selects one among the alternative quantum possibilities as a basis for future action. The collapse, therefore, takes place in the expectation that the observer associated with the state. Stapp's work drew criticism from scientists such as David Bourget and Danko Georgiev.

=== Catecholaminergic neuron electron transport (CNET) ===
CNET is a hypothesized neural signaling mechanism in catecholaminergic neurons that would use quantum mechanical electron transport. The hypothesis is based in part on the observation by many independent researchers that electron tunneling occurs in ferritin, an iron storage protein that is prevalent in those neurons, at room temperature and ambient conditions. The hypothesized function of this mechanism is to assist in action selection, but the mechanism itself would be capable of integrating millions of cognitive and sensory neural signals using a physical mechanism associated with strong electron-electron interactions. Each tunneling event would involve a collapse of an electron wave function, but the collapse would be incidental to the physical effect created by strong electron-electron interactions.

CNET predicted a number of physical properties of these neurons that have been subsequently observed experimentally, such as electron tunneling in substantia nigra pars compacta (SNc) tissue and the presence of disordered arrays of ferritin in SNc tissue. The hypothesis also predicted that disordered ferritin arrays like those found in SNc tissue should be capable of supporting long-range electron transport and providing a switching or routing function, both of which have also been subsequently observed.

Another prediction of CNET was that the largest SNc neurons should mediate action selection. This prediction was contrary to earlier proposals about the function of those neurons at that time, which were based on predictive reward dopamine signaling. A team led by Dr. Pascal Kaeser of Harvard Medical School subsequently demonstrated that those neurons do in fact code movement, consistent with the earlier predictions of CNET. While the CNET mechanism has not yet been directly observed, it may be possible to do so using quantum dot fluorophores tagged to ferritin or other methods for detecting electron tunneling.

CNET is applicable to a number of different consciousness models as a binding or action selection mechanism, such as Integrated Information Theory (IIT) and Sensorimotor Theory (SMT). It is noted that many existing models of consciousness fail to specifically address action selection or binding. For example, O'Regan and Noë call binding a "pseudo problem," but also state that "the fact that object attributes seem perceptually to be part of a single object does not require them to be 'represented' in any unified kind of way, for example, at a single location in the brain, or by a single process. They may be so represented, but there is no logical necessity for this." Simply because there is no "logical necessity" for a physical phenomenon does not mean that it does not exist, or that once it is identified that it can be ignored. Likewise, global workspace theory (GWT) models appear to treat dopamine as modulatory, based on the prior understanding of those neurons from predictive reward dopamine signaling research, but GWT models could be adapted to include modeling of moment-by-moment activity in the striatum to mediate action selection, as observed by Kaiser. CNET is applicable to those neurons as a selection mechanism for that function, as otherwise that function could result in seizures from simultaneous actuation of competing sets of neurons. While CNET by itself is not a model of consciousness, it is able to integrate different models of consciousness through neural binding and action selection. However, a more complete understanding of how CNET might relate to consciousness would require a better understanding of strong electron-electron interactions in ferritin arrays, which implicates the many-body problem.

== Criticism ==
These hypotheses of the quantum mind remain hypothetical speculation, as Penrose admits in his discussions. Until they make a prediction that is tested by experimentation, the hypotheses are not based on empirical evidence. In 2010, Lawrence Krauss was guarded in criticising Penrose's ideas. He said: "Roger Penrose has given lots of new-age crackpots ammunition... Many people are dubious that Penrose's suggestions are reasonable, because the brain is not an isolated quantum-mechanical system. To some extent it could be, because memories are stored at the molecular level, and at a molecular level quantum mechanics is significant." According to Krauss, "It is true that quantum mechanics is extremely strange, and on extremely small scales for short times, all sorts of weird things happen. And in fact, we can make weird quantum phenomena happen. But what quantum mechanics doesn't change about the universe is, if you want to change things, you still have to do something. You can't change the world by thinking about it."

The process of testing the hypotheses with experiments is fraught with conceptual/theoretical, practical, and ethical problems.

=== Conceptual problems ===
The idea that a quantum effect is necessary for consciousness to function is still in the realm of philosophy. Penrose proposes that it is necessary, but other theories of consciousness do not indicate that it is needed. For example, Daniel Dennett proposed a theory called multiple drafts model, which does not indicate that quantum effects are needed, in his 1991 book Consciousness Explained. A philosophical argument on either side is not a scientific proof, although philosophical analysis can indicate key differences in the types of models and show what type of experimental differences might be observed. But since there is no clear consensus among philosophers, there is no conceptual support that a quantum mind theory is needed.

A possible conceptual approach is to use quantum mechanics as an analogy to understand a different field of study like consciousness, without expecting that the laws of quantum physics will apply. An example of this approach is the idea of Schrödinger's cat. Erwin Schrödinger described how one could, in principle, create entanglement of a large-scale system by making it dependent on an elementary particle in a superposition. He proposed a scenario with a cat in a locked steel chamber, wherein the cat's survival depended on the state of a radioactive atom—whether it had decayed and emitted radiation. According to Schrödinger, the Copenhagen interpretation implies that the cat is both alive and dead until the state has been observed. Schrödinger did not wish to promote the idea of dead-and-alive cats as a serious possibility; he intended the example to illustrate the absurdity of the existing view of quantum mechanics. But since Schrödinger's time, physicists have given other interpretations of the mathematics of quantum mechanics, some of which regard the "alive and dead" cat superposition as quite real. Schrödinger's famous thought experiment poses the question of when a system stops existing as a quantum superposition of states. In the same way, one can ask whether the act of making a decision is analogous to having a superposition of states of two decision outcomes, so that making a decision means "opening the box" to reduce the brain from a combination of states to one state. This analogy of decision-making uses a formalism derived from quantum mechanics, but does not indicate the actual mechanism by which the decision is made.

In this way, the idea is similar to quantum cognition. This field clearly distinguishes itself from the quantum mind, as it is not reliant on the hypothesis that there is something micro-physical quantum-mechanical about the brain. Quantum cognition is based on the quantum-like paradigm, generalized quantum paradigm, or quantum structure paradigm that information processing by complex systems such as the brain can be mathematically described in the framework of quantum information and quantum probability theory. This model uses quantum mechanics only as an analogy and does not propose that quantum mechanics is the physical mechanism by which it operates. For example, quantum cognition proposes that some decisions can be analyzed as if there is interference between two alternatives, but it is not a physical quantum interference effect.

=== Practical problems ===
The main theoretical argument against the quantum-mind hypothesis is the assertion that quantum states in the brain would lose coherency before they reached a scale where they could be useful for neural processing. This supposition was elaborated by Max Tegmark. His calculations indicate that quantum systems in the brain decohere at sub-picosecond timescales. No response by a brain has shown computational results or reactions on this fast of a timescale. Typical reactions are on the order of milliseconds, trillions of times longer than sub-picosecond timescales.

Daniel Dennett uses an experimental result in support of his multiple drafts model of an optical illusion that happens on a timescale of less than a second or so. In this experiment, two different-colored lights, with an angular separation of a few degrees at the eye, are flashed in succession. If the interval between the flashes is less than a second or so, the first light that is flashed appears to move across to the position of the second light. Furthermore, the light seems to change color as it moves across the visual field. A green light will appear to turn red as it seems to move across to the position of a red light. Dennett asks how we could see the light change color before the second light is observed. Velmans argues that the cutaneous rabbit illusion, another illusion that happens in about a second, demonstrates that there is a delay while modelling occurs in the brain and that this delay was discovered by Libet. These slow illusions that happen at times of less than a second do not support a proposal that the brain functions on the picosecond timescale.

Penrose says:

The problem with trying to use quantum mechanics in the action of the brain is that if it were a matter of quantum nerve signals, these nerve signals would disturb the rest of the material in the brain, to the extent that the quantum coherence would get lost very quickly. You couldn't even attempt to build a quantum computer out of ordinary nerve signals, because they're just too big and in an environment that's too disorganized. Ordinary nerve signals have to be treated classically. But if you go down to the level of the microtubules, then there's an extremely good chance that you can get quantum-level activity inside them.

For my picture, I need this quantum-level activity in the microtubules; the activity has to be a large-scale thing that goes not just from one microtubule to the next but from one nerve cell to the next, across large areas of the brain. We need some kind of coherent activity of a quantum nature which is weakly coupled to the computational activity that Hameroff argues is taking place along the microtubules.

There are various avenues of attack. One is directly on the physics, on quantum theory, and there are certain experiments that people are beginning to perform, and various schemes for a modification of quantum mechanics. I don't think the experiments are sensitive enough yet to test many of these specific ideas. One could imagine experiments that might test these things, but they'd be very hard to perform.

Penrose also said in an interview:

...whatever consciousness is, it must be beyond computable physics.... It's not that consciousness depends on quantum mechanics, it's that it depends on where our current theories of quantum mechanics go wrong. It's to do with a theory that we don't know yet.

A demonstration of a quantum effect in the brain has to explain this problem or explain why it is not relevant, or that the brain somehow circumvents the problem of the loss of quantum coherency at body temperature. As Penrose proposes, it may require a new type of physical theory, something "we don't know yet."

=== Ethical problems ===
Deepak Chopra has referred a "quantum soul" existing "apart from the body", human "access to a field of infinite possibilities", and other quantum mysticism topics such as quantum healing or quantum effects of consciousness. Seeing the human body as being undergirded by a "quantum-mechanical body" composed not of matter but of energy and information, he believes that "human aging is fluid and changeable; it can speed up, slow down, stop for a time, and even reverse itself", as determined by one's state of mind. Robert Carroll states that Chopra attempts to integrate Ayurveda with quantum mechanics to justify his teachings. Chopra argues that what he calls "quantum healing" cures any manner of ailments, including cancer, through effects that he claims are based on the same principles as quantum mechanics. This has led physicists to object to his use of the term quantum in reference to medical conditions and the human body. Chopra said: "I think quantum theory has a lot of things to say about the observer effect, about non-locality, about correlations. So I think there's a school of physicists who believe that consciousness has to be equated, or at least brought into the equation, in understanding quantum mechanics." On the other hand, he also claims that quantum effects are "just a metaphor. Just like an electron or a photon is an indivisible unit of information and energy, a thought is an indivisible unit of consciousness." In his book Quantum Healing, Chopra stated the conclusion that quantum entanglement links everything in the Universe, and therefore it must create consciousness.

According to Daniel Dennett, "On this topic, Everybody's an expert... but they think that they have a particular personal authority about the nature of their own conscious experiences that can trump any hypothesis they find unacceptable."

While quantum effects are significant in the physiology of the brain, critics of quantum mind hypotheses challenge whether the effects of known or speculated quantum phenomena in biology scale up to have significance in neuronal computation, much less the emergence of consciousness as phenomenon. Daniel Dennett said, "Quantum effects are there in your car, your watch, and your computer. But most things—most macroscopic objects—are, as it were, oblivious to quantum effects. They don't amplify them; they don't hinge on them."

== See also ==
- Artificial consciousness
- Bohm interpretation of quantum mechanics
- Coincidence detection in neurobiology
- Critical brain hypothesis
- Electromagnetic theories of consciousness
- Evolutionary neuroscience
- Hameroff-Penrose Orchestrated Objective Reduction
- Hard problem of consciousness
- Holonomic brain theory
- Many-minds interpretation
- Mechanism (philosophy)
- Neuroplasticity
- Quantum cognition
- Quantum neural network
