= Peter Carruthers (philosopher) =

American philosopher (born 1952)

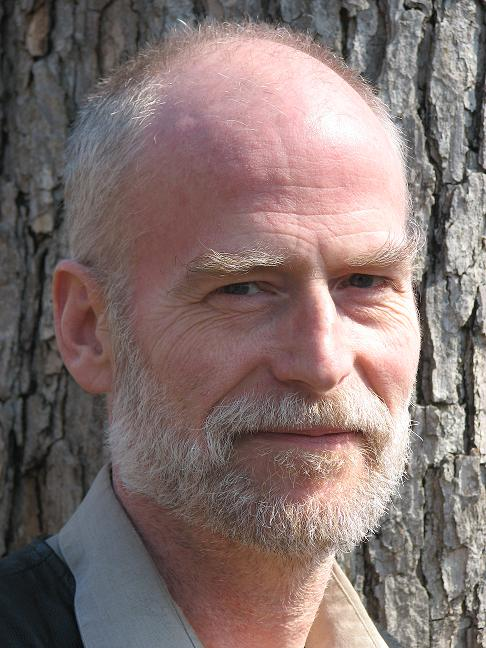
- Carruthers in 2008
- Born: June 16, 1952 (age 73)

Education
- Doctoral advisor: Michael Dummett

Philosophical work
- Era: Contemporary philosophy
- Region: Western philosophy
- School: Analytic
- Institutions: University of Maryland
- Main interests: Philosophy of mind Consciousness; Self-knowledge; Cognitive science
- Notable ideas: Dispositional higher-order thought (DHOT) theory of consciousness (also known as dual-content theory); The importance of action-rehearsal (including inner speech) for conscious forms of cognition Massively modular architecture of the human mind

Peter Carruthers (born June 16, 1952) is a British philosopher working primarily in the area of philosophy of mind. He is Professor of Philosophy at the University of Maryland, associate member of Neuroscience and Cognitive Science Program and member of the Committee for Philosophy and the Sciences.

== Background ==
Before he moved to the University of Maryland in 2001, Carruthers was Professor of Philosophy at the University of Sheffield where he founded and directed the Hang Seng Centre for Cognitive Studies and prior to that was a lecturer at University of Essex, Queen's University of Belfast, University of St. Andrews, and University of Oxford. He was educated at the University of Leeds before studying for his D.Phil at University of Oxford under Michael Dummett.

== Notable ideas ==
=== Role of language in cognition ===
There is a spectrum of opinions on the role of language in cognition. At one extreme, philosophers like Michael Dummett have argued that thought is impossible in the absence of language; and social scientists influenced by Benjamin Whorf have believed that the natural languages that people grow up speaking will have a profound influence on the character of their thoughts. At the other extreme, philosophers like Jerry Fodor, together with most cognitive scientists, have believed that language is but an input/output device for cognition, playing no significant role in thought itself. Carruthers has steered a path in between these two extremes. In his 1996 book, he allowed that much thought can and does occur in the absence of language, while arguing for a constitutive role for language in conscious thinking, conducted in "inner speech". In his 2006 book, this position is broadened and deepened. Following Antonio Damasio, he argues that mental rehearsals of action issue in imagery that plays a profound role in human practical reasoning, with inner speech now being seen as a subset of action rehearsal. Carruthers now argues that the serial use of these rehearsals can issue in a whole new level of thinking and reasoning, serving to realize the "dual systems" that psychologists like Daniel Kahneman believe to be involved in human reasoning processes.

=== Massive modularity of the human mind ===
Evolutionary psychologists like Leda Cosmides, John Tooby, and Steven Pinker have claimed that the mind consists of a great many distinct functionally specialized systems, or modules. Jerry Fodor has argued, in contrast, that the "central" processes of the mind (judging, reasoning, deciding, and so forth) cannot be modular. In his 2006 book, Carruthers lays out the main case supporting massive modularity, shows how the notion of "module" in this context should properly be understood, and takes up Fodor's challenge by showing how the distinctive flexibility, creativity, and rationality of the human mind can result from the interactions of massive numbers of modules.

=== Dispositional higher-order thought theory of consciousness ===
Amongst philosophers who think that consciousness admits of explanation, the most popular approach has been some or other variety of representationalism. Representationalists hold that the distinctive features of consciousness can be explained by appeal to the representational contents (together with the causal roles) of experience. First-order representationalists like Fred Dretske and Michael Tye believe that the relevant contents are world-directed ones (colors, sounds, and so forth) of a distinctive sort (non-conceptual, analog, or fine-grained). Higher-order representationalists like William Lycan, David M. Rosenthal, and Carruthers, in contrast, maintain that we need to be aware of undergoing these first-order experiences in order for the latter to qualify as conscious. On Carruthers' view, the awareness in question is dispositional. By virtue of an experience being available to higher-order thought, it is claimed to acquire a higher-order non-conceptual content. Hence, conscious experiences have a dual content: while representing the world to us, they also represent themselves to us. Conscious experiences are thus held to be self-representational ones.

=== Denial of introspection for thoughts ===
Most people (philosophers and non-philosophers alike) assume that they have direct introspective access to their own propositional attitude events of judging, deciding, and so forth. We think of ourselves as knowing our own thought processes immediately, without having to interpret ourselves (in the way that we do need to interpret the behavior and circumstances of other people if we are to know what they are thinking). In a series of recent papers Carruthers has argued that this introspective intuition is illusory. While allowing that we do have introspective access to our own experiences, including imagistic experiences of the sort that occur during "inner speech", he draws on evidence from across the cognitive sciences to argue that our knowledge of our own judgments and decisions results from us turning our interpretative skills upon ourselves. He also argues that while inner speech plays important roles in human cognition, it never plays the right sort of role to constitute a judgment, or a decision. The latter processes always occur below the surface of consciousness, Carruthers claims.

== Primary research interests ==
His primary research interests are in philosophy of mind, philosophy of psychology, and cognitive science. He has worked especially on theories of consciousness, the role of natural language in human cognition, and modularity of mind, but has also published on such issues as: the mentality of animals; the nature and status of our folk psychology; nativism (innateness); human creativity; theories of intentional content; and defence of a notion of narrow content for psychological explanation. He is presently working on a book project, which examines the cognitive basis of our understanding of the minds of others and its relationship to our access to our own minds. He has also written a book in applied ethics, arguing that animals do not have moral rights. In it he explains why he prefers "global workspace theory" as the criterion of consciousness, shows that we cannot ascertain whether animals fulfil this, and concludes that anyway the possession of consciousness is irrelevant to moral rights.

== Work ==
He is the author of several books:

- Language, Thought and Consciousness: An Essay in Philosophical Psychology (1996)
- The Philosophy of Psychology (1999)
- Phenomenal Consciousness: A Naturalistic Theory (2000)
- The Nature of the Mind: An Introduction (2004)
- Consciousness: Essays from a Higher-order Perspective (2005)
- The Architecture of the Mind: Massive Modularity and the Flexibility of Thought (2006)
- Human and Animal Minds: The Consciousness Questions Laid to Rest (2019), OUP, ISBN 9780198843702.
- Explaining our Actions: A Critique of Common-Sense Theorizing (2025)

Carruthers has also published several monographs on Wittgenstein's Tractatus Logico-Philosophicus and co-edited seven interdisciplinary books in cognitive science (cf. selected publications). He is the author of numerous articles on consciousness and self-knowledge, cognitive architecture, the role of language in cognition, mental modularity, human creativity, animal mentality, nature, extent and moral significance and miscellaneous papers and book chapters. Furthermore, he has written books on epistemology and ethics, which are areas in which he continues to have interests.

== Selected publications ==
A partial list of publications by Carruthers:

- The Architecture of the Mind: massive modularity and the flexibility of thought (2006). Oxford University Press: ISBN 0-19-920707-0
- Consciousness: essays from a higher-order perspective (2005). Oxford University Press.: ISBN 0-19-927736-2
- The Nature of the Mind: an introduction (2004). Routledge: ISBN 978-0-415-29995-4 (paperback) ISBN 978-0-415-29994-7 (hardcover)
- Phenomenal Consciousness: a naturalistic theory (2000). Cambridge University Press: ISBN 0-521-54399-1.
- The Philosophy of Psychology (1999). Cambridge University Press: ISBN 0-521-55915-4.
- Language, Thought and Consciousness: an essay in philosophical psychology (1996). Cambridge University Press: ISBN 0-521-63999-9.
- The Innate Mind: volume 3: foundations and the future. Co-editor (with Stephen Laurence and Stephen Stich), (2007). Oxford University Press. ISBN 0-19-533282-2.
- The Innate Mind: volume 2: culture and cognition. Co-editor (with Stephen Laurence and Stephen Stich), (2006). Oxford University Press. ISBN 0-19-531014-4.
- The Innate Mind: volume 1 structure and contents. Co-editor (with Stephen Laurence and Stephen Stich), (2005). Oxford University Press. ISBN 0-19-517999-4.
- The Cognitive Basis of Science. Co-editor (with Stephen Stich and Michael Siegal), (2002). Cambridge University Press. ISBN 0-521-01177-9
- Evolution and the Human Mind: modularity, language and meta-cognition. Co-editor (with Andrew Chamberlain), (2000). Cambridge University Press. ISBN 0-521-78908-7
- Language and Thought: interdisciplinary themes. Co-editor (with Jill Boucher), (1998). Cambridge University Press. ISBN 0-521-63758-9.
- Theories of Theories of Mind. Co-editor (with Peter K Smith), (1996). Cambridge University Press. ISBN 0-521-55916-2.
