= Henry Stapp =

American mathematical physicist

- Born: Henry Pierce Stapp; March 23, 1928 (age 98); Cleveland, Ohio, U.S.
- Education: University of Michigan (B.Sc.); University of California, Berkeley (M.A., Ph.D.)
- Scientific career
- Fields: Theoretical physics, quantum mechanics
- Workplaces: University of California, Berkeley
- Doctoral advisor: Emilio Segrè; Owen Chamberlain

Henry Pierce Stapp (born March 23, 1928) is an American mathematical physicist, known for his work in quantum mechanics, particularly the development of axiomatic S-matrix theory, the proofs of strong nonlocality properties, and the place of free will in the orthodox quantum mechanics of John von Neumann. He is considered a member of the Fundamental Fysiks Group.

== Biography ==
Stapp received his PhD in particle physics at the University of California, Berkeley, under the supervision of Nobel laureates Emilio Segrè and Owen Chamberlain.

In 1958, Stapp was invited by Wolfgang Pauli to ETH Zurich to work with him personally on basic problems in quantum mechanics. When Pauli died in December 1958, Stapp studied von Neumann's book on quantum mechanics, and on the basis of that work composed an article entitled "Mind, Matter and Quantum Mechanics", which was not submitted for publication; but the title became the title of his 1993 book.

In 1969 Stapp was invited by Werner Heisenberg to work with him at the Max Planck Institute in Munich.

In 1976 Stapp was invited by J.A. Wheeler to work with him on problems in the foundations of quantum mechanics. Dr. Stapp has published many papers pertaining to the non-local aspects of quantum mechanics and Bell's theorem, including three books.

Stapp has worked also in a number of conventional areas of high energy physics, including analysis of the scattering of polarized protons, parity violation, and S-matrix theory.

== Research ==
Some of Stapp's work concerns the implications of quantum mechanics. He has argued for the relevance of quantum mechanics to consciousness and free will.

Stapp favors consciousness causes collapse, the idea that quantum wave functions collapse only when they interact with consciousness as a consequence of "orthodox" quantum mechanics. He argues that quantum wave functions collapse when conscious minds select one among the alternative quantum possibilities. His hypothesis of how mind may interact with matter via quantum processes in the brain differs from that of Roger Penrose and Stuart Hameroff's orchestrated objective reduction. While they postulate quantum computing in the microtubules in brain neurons, Stapp postulates a more global collapse, a 'mind like' wave-function collapse that exploits certain aspects of the quantum Zeno effect within the synapses. Stapp's view of the neural correlate of attention is explained in his book, Mindful Universe: Quantum Mechanics and the Participating Observer (2007). Stapp has claimed that consciousness is fundamental to the universe.

In this book he credits John von Neumann's Mathematical Foundations of Quantum Mechanics (1932) with providing an orthodox quantum mechanics demonstrating mathematically the essential role of quantum physics in the mind. Stapp has taken interest in the work of Alfred North Whitehead. He has proposed what he calls a "revised Whiteheadianism". He has also written a chapter "Whiteheadian Process and Quantum Theory" (pp. 92–102) in the book Physics and Whitehead: Quantum, Process, and Experience (2003).

His philosophy has been described as being influenced by both Heisenberg's physical realism and Bohr's idealism. A form of panpsychism Philosopher Gordon Globus noted that "Stapp unhesitatingly descends into panexperientialism". Stapp has co-authored papers with Jeffrey M. Schwartz. Schwartz has connected the work of Stapp with the concept of "mental force" and spiritual practices of Buddhism.

== Reception ==
Stapp's work has drawn criticism from scientists such as David Bourget and Danko Georgiev. Recent papers and a book by Georgiev criticize Stapp's model in two aspects: (1) The mind in Stapp's model does not have its own wavefunction or density matrix, but nevertheless can act upon the brain using projection operators. Such usage is not compatible with standard quantum mechanics because one can attach any number of ghostly minds to any point in space that act upon physical quantum systems with any projection operators. Therefore, Stapp's model does not build upon "the prevailing principles of physics", but negates them. (2) Stapp's claim that quantum Zeno effect is robust against environmental decoherence directly contradicts a basic theorem in quantum information theory according to which acting with projection operators upon the density matrix of a quantum system can never decrease the von Neumann entropy of the system, but can only increase it. Stapp has responded to Bourget and Georgiev stating that the allegations of errors are incorrect.

== Selected publications ==
- Stapp, H; Schwartz, J. M; Beauregard, M. (2005). Quantum theory in neuroscience and psychology: A neurophysical model of mind-brain interaction. Philosophical Transactions of the Royal Society of London, Series B. 360 (1458): 1309-1327. Full paper
- Stapp, H; Schwartz, J. M; Beauregard, M. (2004). The volitional influence of the mind on the brain, with special reference to emotional self-regulation. In Beauregard, M. (Ed.). Consciousness, emotional self-regulation, and the brain, Philadelphia, PA: John Benjamins Publishing Company, Chapter 7. ISBN 90-272-5187-8
- Stapp, H. (2009). Mind, Matter and Quantum Mechanics (The Frontiers Collection). Springer. ISBN 978-3-540-89653-1
- Stapp, H. (2011). Mindful Universe: Quantum Mechanics and the Participating Observer. Springer. ISBN 978-3-642-18075-0
- Stapp, H. (2017). Quantum Theory and Free Will: How Mental Intentions Translate into Bodily Actions. Springer. ISBN 978-3-319-58301-3

== See also ==
- Epistemological Letters
- Consciousness causes collapse
- Quantum mind
- Quantum Zeno effect
