= Eternal oblivion =

The view of death as a state of non-existence

Eternal oblivion is a permanent loss of conscious existence held by some to occur upon death. This outcome is typically associated with physicalist and atheist viewpoints that view consciousness as the mechanical result of a sufficiently complex thinking system, i.e. the brain, with one's subjective experience of personhood and reality therefore being irreversibly lost once such a system ceases function. This is in contrast to the spiritualist or religious view describing an immortal soul that maintains individual life and experience into an afterlife upon the death of the physical body. Conditionalism, annihilationism, and mortalism are viewpoints that make use of eternal oblivion within Christian theology.

== In philosophy ==
In the Apology of Socrates (written by Plato), after Socrates is sentenced to death, he addresses the court. He ponders the nature of death and summarizes that there are two major schools of thought on the afterlife. The first is that it is a migration of the soul or consciousness from this existence into another, and that the souls of all previously deceased people will also be there. This excites Socrates, because he will be able to conduct his dialectic inquiries with all of the great Greek heroes and thinkers of the past.

The other opinion about death is that it is oblivion, the complete cessation of consciousness, not only unable to feel but a complete lack of awareness, like a person in a deep, dreamless sleep. Socrates says that even this oblivion does not frighten him very much, because while he would be unaware, he would correspondingly be free from any pain or suffering. Socrates stated that not even the great King of Persia could say that he ever rested so soundly and peacefully as he did in a dreamless sleep.

Cicero, writing three centuries later in his treatise On Old Age, in the voice of Cato the Elder, similarly discussed the prospects of death, frequently referring to the works of earlier Greek writers. Cicero also concluded that death was either a continuation of consciousness or cessation of it, and that if consciousness continues in some form, there is no reason to fear death; while if it is in fact eternal oblivion, he will be free of all worldly miseries, in which case he should also not be deeply troubled by death. Similar thoughts about death were expressed by the Roman poet and philosopher Lucretius in his first-century BC didactic poem De rerum natura and by the ancient Greek philosopher Epicurus in his Letter to Menoeceus, in which he writes:

Accustom yourself to believing that death is nothing to us, for good and evil imply the capacity for sensation, and death is the privation of all sentience; therefore, a correct understanding that death is nothing to us makes the mortality of life enjoyable, not by adding to life a limitless time, but by taking away the yearning after immortality. For life has no terrors for him who has thoroughly understood that there are no terrors for him in ceasing to live. Foolish, therefore, is the man who says that he fears death, not because it will pain when it comes, but because it pains in the prospect. Whatever causes no annoyance when it is present causes only a groundless pain in the expectation. Death, therefore, the most awful of evils, is nothing to us, seeing that, when we are, death is not come, and when death is come, we are not. It is nothing, then, either to the living or to the dead, for with the living it is not and the dead exist no longer.

== Scientific views ==
Popular models of consciousness in modern neuroscience view the brain as the basis of subjective experience, agency, self-awareness, and awareness of the surrounding natural world. When brain death occurs, all brain function ceases.

Many atheistic neuroscientists and neurophilosophers, such as Daniel Dennett, believe that consciousness is dependent upon the functioning of the brain and death is a cessation of consciousness. Scientific research has discovered that some areas of the brain, like the reticular activating system or the thalamus, appear to be necessary for consciousness because dysfunction of or damage to these structures leads to disorders of consciousness. Through a naturalist analysis of the mind, it is regarded as being dependent on the brain, as shown from the various effects of brain damage.

Paraphrasing philosopher Paul Edwards, Keith Augustine and Yonatan Fishman state that "the greater the damage to the brain, the greater the corresponding damage to the mind. The natural extrapolation from this pattern is all too clear – obliterate brain functioning altogether, and mental functioning too will cease."

== Oblivion and subjectivity ==
Thomas Clark, founder of Center for Naturalism, wrote a paper titled "Death, Nothingness, and Subjectivity" (1994). He critiqued what he saw as a flawed description of eternal oblivion as a "plunge into darkness". When some imagine their deaths, they project themselves into a future self which experiences an eternal silent darkness. He argues that this is wrong, because without consciousness, there is no awareness of space and no basis for time – there cannot be darkness, because to experience darkness, one must be conscious of it. For Clark, in oblivion there is even an absence of experience, as we can only speak of experience when a subjective self exists. According to neuroscientist Giulio Tononi, consciousness is "all we are and all we have: lose consciousness and, as far as you are concerned, your own self and the entire world dissolve into nothingness."

== See also ==
- Annihilationism
- Anattā
- Christian mortalism
- Afterlife
- Information-theoretic death
- Neural correlates of consciousness
- Nirvana
- Eyestalk
