= Consciousness causes collapse =

Interpretation of quantum mechanics

The postulate that consciousness causes collapse is the main ingredient of an interpretation of quantum mechanics in which consciousness is the mechanism behind the process of measurement in quantum mechanics. It is a historical interpretation of quantum mechanics that is largely discarded by modern physicists. The idea is attributed to Eugene Wigner who wrote about it in the 1960s, but traces of the idea appear as early as the 1930s. Wigner later rejected this interpretation in the 1970s and 1980s.

This interpretation has been tied to the origin of pseudoscientific currents and New Age movements, specifically quantum mysticism.

== History ==
=== Earlier work ===
According to Werner Heisenberg’s recollections in Physics and Beyond, Niels Bohr is said to have rejected the necessity of a conscious observer in quantum mechanics as early as 1927.

Albert Einstein was often misportrayed by the British press as a supporter that consciouness was fundamental. During an interview in 1932 when he was asked about that, Einstein replied that "No physicist believes that. Otherwise he wouldn't be a physicist."

In his book Mathematical Foundations of Quantum Mechanics (1932), John von Neumann argued that the mathematics of quantum mechanics allows the collapse of the wave function to be placed at any position in the causal chain from the measurement device to the "subjective perception" of the human observer. However von Neumann did not explicitly relate measurement with consciousness.

In 1939, Fritz London and Edmond Bauer argued that the consciousness of the observer played an important role in measurement. However London wrote about consciousness in terms of philosophical phenomenology and not necessarily as a physical process.

=== Wigner's work ===
The idea that "consciousness causes collapse" is attributed to Eugene Wigner who first wrote about it in his 1961 article "Remarks on the mind-body question" and developed it further during the 1960s. Wigner reformulated the Schrödinger's cat thought experiment as Wigner's friend and proposed that the consciousness of an observer is the demarcation line that precipitates collapse of the wave function, independent of any realist interpretation. The mind is postulated to be non-physical and the only true measurement apparatus.

The idea was criticized early by Abner Shimony in 1963 and by Hilary Putnam a year later.

Wigner discarded the conscious collapse interpretation in the later 1970s. In a 1982 lecture, Wigner said that his early view of quantum mechanics should be criticized as solipsism. In 1984, he wrote that he was convinced out of it by the 1970 work of H. Dieter Zeh on quantum decoherence and macroscopic quantum phenomena.

=== After Wigner ===
The idea of consciousness causing collapse has been promoted and developed by Henry Stapp, a member of the Fundamental Fysiks Group, since 1993.

== Description ==
=== Measurement in standard quantum mechanics ===
In the orthodox Copenhagen interpretation, quantum mechanics predicts only the probabilities for different observed experimental outcomes. What constitutes an observer or a measurement is not directly specified by the theory, and the behavior of a system under measurement and observation is completely different from its usual behavior: the wavefunction that describes a system spreads out into an ever-larger superposition of different possible situations. However, during observation, the wavefunction describing the system collapses to one of several options. If there is no observation, this collapse does not occur, and none of the options ever become less likely.

It can be predicted using quantum mechanics, absent a collapse postulate, that an observer observing a quantum superposition will turn into a superposition of different observers seeing different things. The observer will have a wavefunction which describes all the possible outcomes. Still, in actual experience, an observer never senses a superposition, but always senses that one of the outcomes has occurred with certainty. This apparent conflict between a wavefunction description and classical experience is called the problem of observation (see Measurement problem).

=== Consciousness-causes-collapse interpretation ===
This consciousness causes collapse interpretation has been summarized thus:

The rules of quantum mechanics are correct but there is only one system which may be treated with quantum mechanics, namely the entire material world. There exist external observers which cannot be treated within quantum mechanics, namely human (and perhaps animal) minds, which perform measurements on the brain causing wave function collapse.

Stapp has argued for the concept as follows:

From the point of view of the mathematics of quantum theory it makes no sense to treat a measuring device as intrinsically different from the collection of atomic constituents that make it up. A device is just another part of the physical universe... Moreover, the conscious thoughts of a human observer ought to be causally connected most directly and immediately to what is happening in his brain, not to what is happening out at some measuring device... Our bodies and brains thus become ... parts of the quantum mechanically described physical universe. Treating the entire physical universe in this unified way provides a conceptually simple and logically coherent theoretical foundation...

== Objections to the interpretation ==
Wigner shifted away from "consciousness causes collapse" in his later years. This was partly because he was embarrassed that "consciousness causes collapse" can lead to a kind of solipsism, but also because he decided that he had been wrong to try to apply quantum physics at the scale of everyday life (specifically, he rejected his initial idea of treating macroscopic objects as isolated systems).

Bohr said circa 1927 that it "still makes no difference whether the observer is a man, an animal, or a piece of apparatus."

This interpretation relies upon an interactionist form of dualism that is inconsistent with the materialism that is commonly used to understand the brain, and accepted by most scientists. (Materialism assumes that consciousness has no special role in relation to quantum mechanics.) The measurement problem notwithstanding, they point to a causal closure of physics, suggesting a problem with how consciousness and matter might interact, reminiscent of objections to Descartes' substance dualism.

The only form of interactionist dualism that has seemed even remotely tenable in the contemporary picture is one that exploits certain properties of quantum mechanics. There are two ways this might go. First, some [e.g., Eccles 1986] have appealed to the existence of quantum indeterminacy, and have suggested that a nonphysical consciousness might be responsible for filling the resultant causal gaps, determining which values some physical magnitudes might take within an apparently "probabilistic" distribution... This is an audacious and interesting suggestion, but it has a number of problems... A second way in which quantum mechanics bears on the issue of causal closure lies with the fact that in some interpretations of the quantum formalism, consciousness itself plays a vital causal role, being required to bring about the so-called "collapse of the wave-function." This collapse is supposed to occur upon any act of measurement; and in one interpretation, the only way to distinguish a measurement from a nonmeasurement is via the presence of consciousness. This theory is certainly not universally accepted (for a start, it presupposes that consciousness is not itself physical, surely contrary to the views of most physicists), and I do not accept it myself, but in any case it seems that the kind of causal work consciousness performs here is quite different from the kind required for consciousness to play a role in directing behavior... In any case, all versions of interactionist dualism have a conceptual problem that suggests that they are less successful in avoiding epiphenomenalism than they might seem; or at least they are no better off than naturalistic dualism. Even on these views, there is a sense in which the phenomenal is irrelevant. We can always subtract the phenomenal component from any explanatory account, yielding a purely causal component.

— David Chalmers, "The Irreducibility of Consciousness" in The Conscious Mind: In Search of a Fundamental Theory

The interpretation has also been criticized for not explaining which things have sufficient consciousness to collapse the wave function. Also, it posits an important role for the conscious mind, and it has been questioned how this could be the case for the earlier universe, before consciousness had evolved or emerged. It has been argued that "[consciousness causes collapse] does not allow sensible discussion of Big Bang cosmology or biological evolution". For example, Roger Penrose remarked: "[T]he evolution of conscious life on this planet is due to appropriate mutations having taken place at various times. These, presumably, are quantum events, so they would exist only in linearly superposed form until they finally led to the evolution of a conscious being—whose very existence depends on all the right mutations having 'actually' taken place!" Others further suppose a universal mind (see also panpsychism and panexperientialism). Other researchers have expressed similar objections to the introduction of any subjective element in the collapse of the wavefunction.

== Testability ==
It has been argued that the results of delayed-choice quantum eraser experiments empirically falsify this interpretation. However, the argument was shown to be invalid because an interference pattern would only be visible after post-measurement detections were correlated through use of a coincidence counter; if that was not true, the experiment would allow signaling into the past. The delayed-choice quantum eraser experiment has also been used to argue for support of this interpretation, but, as with other arguments, none of the cited references prove or falsify this interpretation.

The central role played by consciousness in this interpretation naturally calls for use of psychological experiments to verify or falsify it. One such approach relies on explaining the empirical presentiment effect quantum mechanically. Another approach makes use of the psychological priming effect to design an appropriate test. Both methods claim verification success.

== Reception ==
A poll was conducted at a quantum mechanics conference in 2011 using 33 participants (including physicists, mathematicians, and philosophers). Researchers found that 6% of participants (2 of the 33) indicated that they believed the observer "plays a distinguished physical role (e.g., wave-function collapse by consciousness)". This poll also states that 55% (18 of the 33) indicated that they believed the observer "plays a fundamental role in the application of the formalism but plays no distinguished physical role". They also mention that "Popular accounts have sometimes suggested that the Copenhagen interpretation attributes such a role to consciousness. In our view, this is to misunderstand the Copenhagen interpretation."

== See also ==
- Interpretations of quantum mechanics
- Measurement in quantum mechanics
- Quantum mind
- Quantum Zeno effect
