= Hiroomi Umezawa =

- Born: September 20, 1924; Kurihashi, Saitama, Japan
- Died: March 24, 1995 (aged 70); Edmonton, Alberta, Canada
- Education: Nagoya University, Japan; University of Wisconsin–Milwaukee, Wisconsin, USA; University of Alberta, Canada
- Awards: Killam Memorial Chair, University of Alberta
- Scientific career
- Fields: Theoretical physics
- Workplaces: University of Tokyo, Japan; University of Naples, Italy

Hiroomi Umezawa (梅沢 博臣, Umezawa Hiroomi) (September 20, 1924 – March 24, 1995) was a physicist and Distinguished Professor in the Department of Physics at the University of Wisconsin–Milwaukee and later at the University of Alberta. He is known for his fundamental contributions to quantum field theory and for his work on quantum phenomena in relation to the mind.

== Life ==
Umezawa obtained his PhD from Nagoya University, Japan in 1952. He worked at the University of Tokyo, Japan, and the University of Naples, Italy, and took up a position as professor at the University of Wisconsin–Milwaukee (UWM) in 1966, already considered a famous physicist at the time. He joined the University of Alberta, Canada, in 1975 when he took the Killam Memorial Chair as Professor of Physics, a position which he held until his retirement in 1992.

Umezawa is recognized as one of the eminent quantum field theorists of his generation. He applied his results in quantum field theory also to high energy physics, condensed matter physics, nuclear physics and statistical physics, as well as his considerations of quantum theory and the mind.

== Quantum mind research ==
In 1967, together with L.M. Ricciardi, he proposed a quantum theory of the brain which posits a spatially distributed charge formation exhibiting spontaneous breakdowns at micro levels as the basis for processing at macro levels. In this model, the information resides in the virtual field associated with the dynamics of the cellular matter. This model was subsequently expanded by Stuart, Takahashi and Umezawa with their proposal of the development of long range correlations among neurons due to the interaction of two quantum fields. The approach was built upon by many others, including Karl H. Pribram, and was later expanded by Giuseppe Vitiello to a dissipative quantum model of brain.

== Memorial fund ==
After his death in 1995, Umezawa's family, friends and students set up the Umezawa Fund at the University of Alberta in his memory, dedicated to support studies in physics; among the Memorial Distinguished Visitors has been physicist Gordon Baym of the University of Illinois in 2007.

== Publications ==
Books on quantum theory

- H Umezawa; A Arimitsu, et al. (eds.): Selected papers of Hiroomi Umezawa, Tokyo, Japan (Published by Editorial Committee for Selected Papers of Hiroomi Umezawa), 2001
- Hiroomi Umezawa: Advanced Field Theory: Micro, Macro, and Thermal Physics, American Institute of Physics, 1993, ISBN 978-1563960819
- Hiroomi Umezawa, Giuseppe Vitiello: Quantum Mechanics, Bibliopolis, 1985
- Hiroomi Umezawa, H. Matsumoto, Masashi Tachiki: Thermo field dynamics and condensed states, North-Holland Publishing Company, 1982, ISBN 978-0444863614
- Hiroomi Umezawa: Quantum Field Theory, North-Holland Publishing Co., 1956

Articles on the quantum theory of mind:

- C.I.J. Stuart, Y. Takahashi, H. Umezawa (1979): Mixed system brain dynamics: neural memory as a macroscopic ordered state, Foundations of Physics, vol. 9, pp. 301–307
- C.I.J. Stuart, Y. Takahashi, H. Umezawa (1978): On the stability and non-local properties of memory, Journal of Theoretical Biology, vol. 31, pp. 605–618
- L.M. Ricciardi, U. Umezawa (1967): Brain physics and many-body problems, Kibernetik, vol. 4, pp. 44–48
