= Shadows of the Mind =

Book by Roger Penrose

Shadows of the Mind: A Search for the Missing Science of Consciousness
- Cover of the hardcover edition
- Author: Roger Penrose
- Cover artist: Joel Nakamura
- Language: English
- Subjects: Artificial intelligence, mathematics, quantum mechanics
- Publisher: Oxford University Press, 1st edition
- Publication date: 1994 (1st ed.)
- Publication place: United States
- Media type: Print, e-book
- Pages: 457 pages
- ISBN: 0-19-853978-9 (1st ed.)
- OCLC: 30593111
- Dewey Decimal: 006.3 20
- LC Class: Q335 .P416 1994
- Preceded by: The Emperor's New Mind
- Followed by: The Road to Reality

Shadows of the Mind: A Search for the Missing Science of Consciousness is a 1994 book by mathematical physicist Roger Penrose that serves as a followup to his 1989 book The Emperor's New Mind: Concerning Computers, Minds and The Laws of Physics.

Penrose hypothesizes that:

- Human consciousness is non-algorithmic, and thus is not capable of being modelled by a conventional Turing machine type of digital computer.
- Quantum mechanics plays an essential role in the understanding of human consciousness; specifically, he believes that microtubules within neurons support quantum superpositions.
- The objective collapse of the quantum wavefunction of the microtubules is critical for consciousness.
- The collapse in question is physical behaviour that is non-algorithmic and transcends the limits of computability.
- The human mind has abilities that no Turing machine could possess because of this mechanism of non-computable physics.

== Argument ==
=== Mathematical thought ===
In 1931, the mathematician and logician Kurt Gödel proved his incompleteness theorems, showing that any effectively generated theory capable of expressing elementary arithmetic cannot be both consistent and complete. Further to that, for any consistent formal theory that proves certain basic arithmetic truths, there is an arithmetical statement that is true, but not provable in the theory. The essence of Penrose's argument is that while a formal proof system cannot, because of the theorem, prove its own incompleteness, Gödel-type results are provable by human mathematicians. He takes this disparity to mean that human mathematicians are not describable as formal proof systems and are not running an algorithm, so that the computational theory of mind is false, and computational approaches to artificial general intelligence are unfounded. (The argument was first given by Penrose in The Emperor's New Mind (1989) and is developed further in Shadows of The Mind. An earlier version of the argument was given by J. R. Lucas in 1959. For this reason, the argument is sometimes called the Penrose-Lucas argument.)

=== Objective reduction ===
Penrose's theory of Objective Reduction predicts the relationship between quantum mechanics and general relativity. Penrose proposes that a quantum state remains in superposition until the difference in space-time curvature reaches a significant level. This idea is inspired by quantum gravity, because it uses both the physical constants $\scriptstyle \hbar$ and $\scriptstyle G$. It is an alternative to the Copenhagen interpretation, which posits that superposition fails under observation, and the many-worlds hypothesis, which states that each alternative outcome of a superposition becomes real in a separate world.

Penrose's idea is a type of objective collapse theory. In these theories the wavefunction is a physical wave, which undergoes wave function collapse as a physical process, with observers playing no special role. Penrose theorises that the wave function cannot be sustained in superposition beyond a certain energy difference between the quantum states. He gives an approximate value for this difference: a Planck mass worth of matter, which he calls the "'one-graviton' level". He then hypothesizes that this energy difference causes the wave function to collapse to a single state, with a probability based on its amplitude in the original wave function, a procedure taken from standard quantum mechanics.

=== Orchestrated objective reduction ===
When he wrote his first consciousness book, The Emperor's New Mind in 1989, Penrose lacked a detailed proposal for how such quantum processes could be implemented in the brain. Subsequently, Stuart Hameroff read The Emperor's New Mind and suggested to Penrose that microtubules within brain cells were suitable candidate sites for quantum processing and ultimately for consciousness. The Orch-OR theory arose from the cooperation of these two scientists and was developed in Penrose's second consciousness book Shadows of the Mind (1994).

Hameroff's contribution to the theory derived from studying brain cells (neurons). His interest centred on the cytoskeleton, which provides an internal supportive structure for neurons, and particularly on the microtubules, which are the important component of the cytoskeleton. As neuroscience has progressed, the role of the cytoskeleton and microtubules has assumed greater importance. In addition to providing a supportive structure for the cell, the known functions of the microtubules include transport of molecules, including neurotransmitter molecules bound for the synapses, and control of the cell's movement, growth and shape.

== Criticism ==
=== Gödelian argument and nature of human thought ===
Penrose's views on the human thought process are not widely accepted in certain scientific circles (Drew McDermott, David Chalmers and others). According to Marvin Minsky, because people can construe false ideas to be factual, the process of thinking is not limited to formal logic. Further, AI programs can also conclude that false statements are true, so error is not unique to humans.

In May 1995, Stanford mathematician Solomon Feferman attacked Penrose's approach on multiple grounds, including the mathematical validity of his Gödelian argument and theoretical background. In 1996, Penrose offered a consolidated reply to many of the criticisms of "Shadows".

John Searle criticises Penrose's appeal to Gödel as resting on the fallacy that all computational algorithms must be capable of mathematical description. As a counter-example, Searle cites the assignment of license plate numbers (LPN) to specific vehicle identification numbers (VIN), to register a vehicle. According to Searle, no mathematical function can be used to connect a known VIN with its LPN, but the process of assignment is quite simple—namely, "first come, first served"—and can be performed entirely by a computer.

=== Microtubule hypothesis ===
Penrose and Stuart Hameroff have constructed the Orch-OR theory in which human consciousness is the result of quantum gravity effects in microtubules. However, in 2000, Max Tegmark calculated in an article he published in Physical Review E that the time scale of neuron firing and excitations in microtubules is slower than the decoherence time by a factor of at least 10^{10}. Tegmark's article has been widely cited by critics of the Penrose-Hameroff hypothesis. The reception of the article is summed up by this statement in his support: "Physicists outside the fray, such as IBM's John Smolin, say the calculations confirm what they had suspected all along. 'We're not working with a brain that's near absolute zero. It's reasonably unlikely that the brain evolved quantum behavior', he says." In other words, there is a missing link between physics and neuroscience, and to date, it is too premature to claim that the Orch-OR hypothesis is right.

In response to Tegmark's claims, Hagan, Tuszynski and Hameroff claimed that Tegmark did not address the Orch-OR model, but instead a model of his own construction. This involved superpositions of quanta separated by 24 nm rather than the much smaller separations stipulated for Orch-OR. As a result, Hameroff's group claimed a decoherence time seven orders of magnitude greater than Tegmark's, although still far below 25 ms. Hameroff's group also suggested that the Debye layer of counterions could screen thermal fluctuations, and that the surrounding actin gel might enhance the ordering of water, further screening noise. They also suggested that incoherent metabolic energy could further order water, and finally that the configuration of the microtubule lattice might be suitable for quantum error correction, a means of resisting quantum decoherence.

In 2007, Gregory S. Engel claimed that all arguments concerning the brain being "too warm and wet" have been dispelled, as multiple "warm and wet" quantum processes have been discovered.

== See also ==
- Alan Turing, creator of the Turing test
- Quantum mind

== Notes and references ==
- This article includes text originally by Philip Dorrell which is licensed under the GFDL
