= The Emperor's New Mind =

1989 book by Roger Penrose

The Emperor's New Mind: Concerning Computers, Minds and The Laws of Physics
- Cover of the first edition
- Author: Roger Penrose
- Language: English
- Subject: Artificial intelligence
- Publisher: Oxford University Press
- Publication date: 8 November 1989
- Publication place: United States
- Media type: Print (hardcover and paperback)
- Pages: 480
- ISBN: 0-19-851973-7 (first edition, hardcover)
- OCLC: 19724273
- Dewey Decimal: 006.3 20
- LC Class: Q335 .P415 1989
- Followed by: Shadows of the Mind

The Emperor's New Mind: Concerning Computers, Minds and The Laws of Physics is a 1989 book by the mathematical physicist Roger Penrose that posits a quantum mind theory.

Penrose argues that human consciousness is non-algorithmic, and thus is not capable of being modeled by a conventional Turing machine, which includes a digital computer. Penrose hypothesizes that quantum mechanics plays an essential role in the understanding of human consciousness. The collapse of the quantum wavefunction is seen as playing an important role in brain function.

Most of the book is spent reviewing, for the scientifically minded lay-reader, a plethora of interrelated subjects such as Newtonian physics, special and general relativity, the philosophy and limitations of mathematics, quantum physics, cosmology, and the nature of time. Penrose intermittently describes how each of these bears on his developing theme: that consciousness is not "algorithmic". Only the later portions of the book address the thesis directly.

== Overview ==
Penrose states that his ideas on the nature of consciousness are speculative, and his thesis is considered erroneous by some experts in the fields of philosophy, computer science, and robotics.

The Emperor's New Mind attacks the claims of artificial intelligence using the physics of computing: Penrose notes that the present home of computing lies more in the tangible world of classical mechanics than in the imponderable realm of quantum mechanics. The modern computer is a deterministic system that for the most part simply executes algorithms. Penrose shows that, by reconfiguring the boundaries of a billiard table, one might make a computer in which the billiard balls act as message carriers and their interactions act as logical decisions. The billiard-ball computer was first designed some years ago by Edward Fredkin and Tommaso Toffoli of the Massachusetts Institute of Technology.

== Reception ==
Following the publication of the book, Penrose began to collaborate with Stuart Hameroff on a biological analog to quantum computation involving microtubules, which became the foundation for his subsequent book, Shadows of the Mind: A Search for the Missing Science of Consciousness.

Penrose won the Science Book Prize in 1990 for The Emperor's New Mind.

According to an article in the American Journal of Physics, Penrose incorrectly claims a barrier far away from a localized particle can affect the particle.

== See also ==
- Alan Turing
- Anathem
- Church–Turing thesis
- Mind–body dualism
- Orchestrated objective reduction
- Quantum mind
- Raymond Smullyan
- Shadows of the Mind
- "The Emperor's New Clothes"
- Turing test
