= Physics and Beyond =

1969 book by Werner Heisenberg

Physics and Beyond: Encounters and Conversations
- Author: Werner Heisenberg
- Original title: Der Teil und das Ganze: Gespräche im Umkreis der Atomphysik
- Language: German
- Genre: Science
- Publication date: 1969
- Publication place: Germany

Physics and Beyond: Encounters and Conversations (German: Der Teil und das Ganze: Gespräche im Umkreis der Atomphysik, lit. 'The Part and the Whole: Conversations in the Field of Atomic Physics') is a book by Werner Heisenberg, the German physicist who discovered the uncertainty principle. It tells, from his point of view, the history of exploring atomic science and quantum mechanics in the first half of the 20th century.

The subtitle is "Encounters and Conversations", and the core of the book takes the form of reconstructed discussions between himself and other scientists. Heisenberg said: "I wanted to show that science is done by people, and the most wonderful ideas come from dialog".

Among the chapters are "The first encounter with the science about atoms", "Quantum mechanics and conversations with Einstein", "Conversation about the relation between biology, physics and chemistry", "Conversations about language" and "The behavior of an individual during a political disaster", dated 1937–1941. With other scientists, including Erwin Schrödinger, Niels Bohr, Albert Einstein and Max Planck, Heisenberg discussed physics and other questions related to biology, humans, philosophy, and politics.

He often includes detailed descriptions of the historical atmosphere and natural scenery, as many of the conversations took place while backpacking or sailing.

The book provides a first-hand account about how science is done and how quantum physics, especially the Copenhagen interpretation, emerged.

"Nobody can reproduce these conversations verbatim, but I believe that the spirit of what the people said, and how they did, is conserved," Heisenberg said in the preface.

The book was published first in German 1969, in English as Physics and Beyond (1971) and in French in 1972 as La partie et le tout.

== Bibliography ==
- Heisenberg, Werner (1971). Physics and Beyond: Encounters and Conversations. World Perspectives vol. 42. Translated by Pomerans, Arnold J. New York: Harper & Row. ISBN 9780049250086. LCCN 78095963. OCLC 15379872.
