= Johnjoe McFadden =

Anglo-Irish scientist, academic and writer

- Born: 17 May 1956 (age 70); Donegal, Ireland
- Education: Imperial College London
- Known for: Diagnosis of meningitis Quantum biology Systems biology
- Scientific career
- Fields: Biologist
- Workplaces: University of Surrey; St Mary's Hospital Medical School; St George's, University of London
- Doctoral advisor: Ken Buck
- Website: https://johnjoemcfadden.co.uk/

Johnjoe McFadden (born 17 May 1956) is an Anglo-Irish scientist, academic and writer. He is Professor of Molecular Genetics at the University of Surrey, United Kingdom.

== Life ==
McFadden was born in Donegal, Ireland but raised in the UK. He holds joint British and Irish Nationality. He obtained his BSc in Biochemistry University of London in 1977 and his PhD at Imperial College London in 1982. He went on to work on human genetic diseases and then infectious diseases, at St Mary's Hospital Medical School, London (1982–84) and St George's Hospital Medical School, London (1984–88) and then at the University of Surrey in Guildford, UK.

For more than a decade, McFadden has researched the genetics of microbes such as the agents of tuberculosis and meningitis and invented a test for the diagnosis of meningitis. He has published more than 100 articles in scientific journals on subjects as wide-ranging as bacterial genetics, tuberculosis, idiopathic diseases and computer modelling of evolution. He has contributed to more than a dozen books and has edited a book on the genetics of mycobacteria. He produced a widely reported artificial life computer model which modelled evolution in organisms.

McFadden has lectured extensively in the UK, Europe, the US and Japan and his work has been featured on radio, television and national newspaper articles particularly for the Guardian. His present post, which he has held since 2001, is Professor of Molecular Genetics at the University of Surrey. Living in London, he is married and has one son.

== Quantum evolution ==
McFadden wrote the popular science book, Quantum Evolution. The book examines the role of quantum mechanics in life, evolution and consciousness. The book has been described as offering an alternative evolutionary mechanism, beyond the neo-Darwinian framework.

The book received positive reviews by Kirkus Reviews and Publishers Weekly. It was negatively reviewed in the journal Heredity by evolutionary biologist Wallace Arthur.

== Writing ==
In 2006 McFadden co-edited the book, Human Nature: Fact and Fiction on the insights of both science and literature on human nature, with contributions from Ian McEwan, Philip Pullman, Steven Pinker, A.C. Grayling and others.

in 2014 McFadden co-wrote the popular science book, Life on the Edge: The Coming Age of Quantum Biology, in which he and Jim Al-Khalili further explore quantum biology and particularly recent findings in photosynthesis, enzyme catalysis, avian navigation, olfaction, mutation and neurobiology. The book received positive reviews, for example:

"'Life on the Edge’ gives the clearest account I’ve ever read of the possible ways in which the very small events of the quantum world can affect the world of middle-sized living creatures like us. With great vividness and clarity it shows how our world is tinged, even saturated, with the weirdness of the quantum." (Philip Pullman)

"Hugely ambitious ... the skill of the writing provides the uplift to keep us aloft as we fly through the strange and spectacular terra incognita of genuinely new science." (Tom Whipple The Times)

McFadden regularly writes articles for The Guardian newspaper on topics as varied as quantum mechanics, evolution and genetically modified crops, and has reviewed books there. The Washington Post and Frankfurter Allgemeine Sonntagszeitung have also published his articles.

- Life Is Simple: How Occam’s Razor Set Science Free and Unlocked the Universe (Basic Books, 384pp) ISBN 9781529364934

== See also ==
- Electromagnetic theories of consciousness
- Mind's eye
- Quantum Aspects of Life
