= The Science of Consciousness =

Biannual academic conference

The Science of Consciousness (TSC; formerly Toward a Science of Consciousness) is an international academic conference that has been held biannually since 1994. It is organized by the Center for Consciousness Studies of the University of Arizona. Alternate conferences are held in Arizona (either Tucson or Phoenix), and the others in locations worldwide. The conference is devoted exclusively to the investigation of consciousness.

== Associated people ==
The main organizer is Stuart Hameroff, an anestheologist and the director of the center that hosts the conference. One of the speakers at the first conference, David Chalmers, had co-organized some of the following ones, until the event became too far away from the scientific mainstream.

== Conference books ==
Three books published by MIT Press have resulted from the conference.

John Benjamins published a book containing selected proceedings from TSC 1999.

== Independent academic coverage ==
- An essay review Toward a science of consciousness:Tucson I and II by J. Gray was printed in ISR Interdisciplinary Science Reviews Volume 24 Issue 4 (1 April 1999), pp. 255–260.
- Michael Punt reviewed TSC 2002 in the journal Leonardo.
- In the Journal of Consciousness Exploration & Research, Christopher Holvenstot reviewed TSC 2011, likening it to The Greatest Show on Earth.
- A review of TSC 2012 may be found in the Journal of Consciousness Studies.
- A commentary on dropping the word "Toward" was published in the Journal of Consciousness Studies in 2016.

== Media coverage ==
Chapter 8 of John Horgan's book The Undiscovered Mind is entirely devoted to his experiences at the first (1994) TSC conference.

In The New York Times, George Johnson wrote about the 2016 conference that "wild speculations and carnivalesque pseudoscience were juxtaposed with sober sessions".

The conference and its main organizers were the subject of a long feature in June 2018, first in the Chronicle of Higher Education, and re-published in The Guardian. Tom Bartlett concluded that the conference was "more or less the Stuart [Hameroff] Show. He decides who will and who will not present. [...] Some consciousness researchers believe that the whole shindig has gone off the rails, that it’s seriously damaging the field of consciousness studies, and that it should be shut down."

== See also ==
- Association for the Scientific Study of Consciousness, which puts on a similar series of conferences about consciousness.
