= Jack Tuszyński =

Jack Tuszyński (born 1956) is a Polish professor of oncology and physicist.

== Biography ==
Tuszyński graduated with a master's degree in physics from the University of Poznań in 1980 and obtained his PhD in condensed matter physics three years later from the University of Calgary. He became a postdoctoral fellow at the chemistry department the same year. From 1983 to 1988 he worked at the Department of Physics of the Memorial University of Newfoundland, then worked in the same department at the University of Alberta for two years. From 1990 to 1993 he was promoted to associate, then full professor, and as of 2005 became Allard Chair of the Cross Cancer Institute. He also served in a Division of Experimental Oncology and is an editor of such journals as the Journal of Biological Physics, Research Letters in Physics and many others. He has attained an h-index of 71 as of 2025.

Tuszyński was part of a team of researchers who found that anesthetic drugs allow cell microtubules to re-emit trapped light in a much shorter time than originally thought. They found that light caught inside an energy trap was re-emitted after a delay, and they propose that this process might be explained through quantum laws, with superradiance being investigated as one possibility. With the use of an anesthetic, however, this delay was considerably shorter. The process of consciousness may be behind the delay. A later study from 2024 confirmed the quantum effect called superradiance in a network of tryptophans, which are found in microtubules.

== See also ==
- consciousness
- Stuart Hameroff
- Orchestrated objective reduction (Orch OR)
- Roger Penrose
- quantum superposition
- Vlatko Vedral
