= Gregory D. Scholes =

Professor of Chemistry

Greg Scholes FRS FRSC
- Born: Gregory D. Scholes
- Education: University of Melbourne (PhD)
- Scientific career
- Fields: Photosynthesis; Quantum biology
- Workplaces: Princeton University; University of Toronto
- Thesis: Electronic interactions & interchromophore energy transfer (1994)
- Website: chemistry.princeton.edu/faculty/scholes

Gregory D. Scholes is an Australian physical chemist who is the William S. Tod Professor of Chemistry at Princeton University.

== Education ==
Scholes obtained his BSc. (in 1990) and PhD (in 1994) at the University of Melbourne, the latter of which was obtained while working in the group of Ken Ghiggino.

== Career and research ==
From 1995 to 1997, Scholes was a postdoctoral researcher at Imperial College London, working in the group of David Phillips. He then undertook further postdoctoral research in the group of Graham R. Fleming. Scholes started his independent career at the University of Toronto, where he was made an assistant professor in 2000, an associate professor in 2005 and professor in 2010. He was the D.J. LeRoy Distinguished Professor from 2011 to 2014. In 2014 he moved to Princeton University, where he is currently the William S. Tod Professor of Chemistry.

Scholes has been editor-in-chief of the Journal of Physical Chemistry Letters since 2019. Scholes was elected a Fellow of the Royal Society (FRS) in 2019 for "substantial contributions to the improvement of natural knowledge".

Scholes' research interests are in photosynthesis and quantum biology.

== Awards and honours ==
- 2007: Royal Society of Canada - Rutherford Memorial Medal
- 2009: Fellow of the Royal Society of Canada
- 2012: RSC Bourke Award
- 2019: Fellow of the Royal Society (London)
