= Stuart Hameroff =

American anesthesiologist

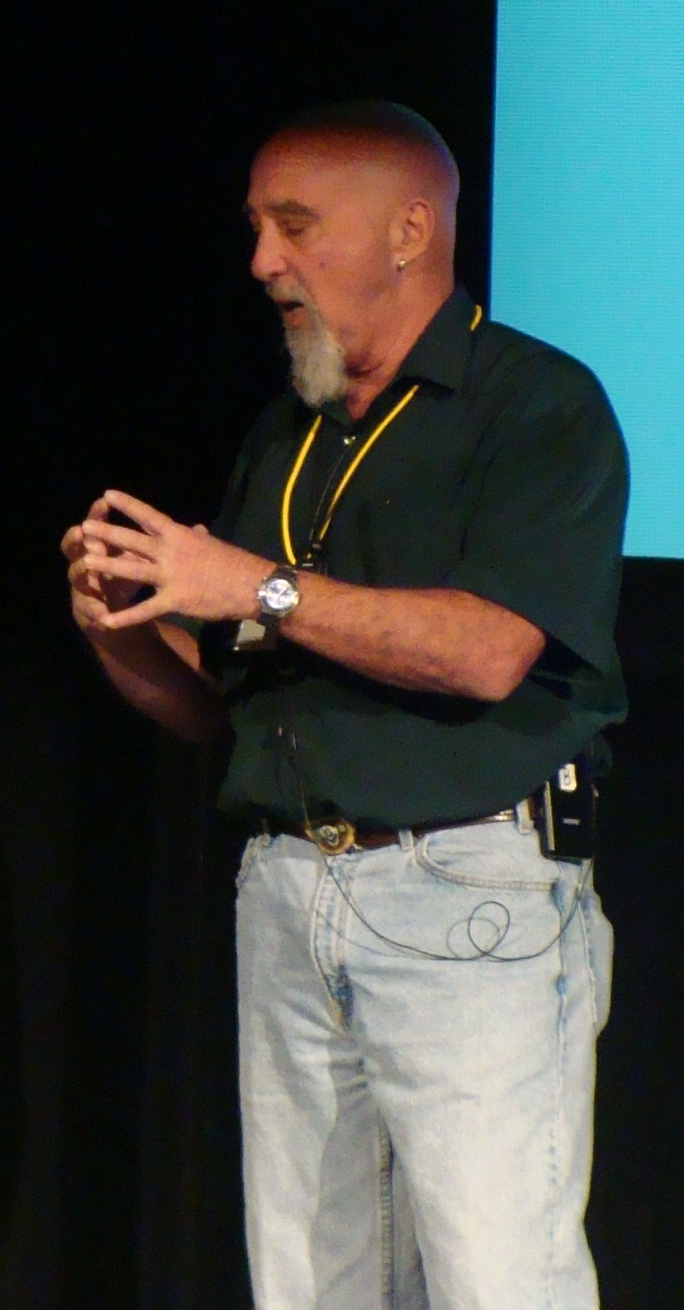
- Hameroff in 2008
- Born: 16 July 1947 (age 79); Buffalo, New York, U.S.
- Education: University of Pittsburgh (B.S.); Hahnemann University Hospital (M.D.)
- Known for: Consciousness studies Toward a Science of Consciousness
- Scientific career
- Fields: Anesthesiologist
- Workplaces: University of Arizona

Stuart Hameroff (born July 16, 1947) is an American anesthesiologist and professor at the University of Arizona known for his studies of consciousness and his controversial contention that consciousness originates from quantum states in neural microtubules. He is the lead organizer of the Science of Consciousness conference.

== Career ==
Hameroff received his BS degree from the University of Pittsburgh and his MD degree from Hahnemann University Hospital, where he studied before it became part of the Drexel University College of Medicine. He took an internship at the Tucson Medical Center in 1973. From 1975 onwards, he has spent the whole of his career at the University of Arizona, becoming professor in the Department of Anesthesiology and Psychology and director for the Center for Consciousness Studies, both in 1999, and finally Emeritus professor for Anesthesiology and Psychology in 2003.

== Theory ==
At the very beginning of Hameroff's career, while he was at Hahnemann, cancer-related research work piqued his interest in the part played by microtubules in cell division, and led him to speculate that they were controlled by some form of computing. It also suggested to him that part of the solution of the problem of consciousness might lie in understanding the operations of microtubules in brain cells, operations at the molecular and supramolecular level.

Hameroff's first book Ultimate Computing (1987) argues that microtubes allow for computation sufficient to explain consciousness. The main substance of this book dealt with the scope for information processing in biological tissue and especially in microtubules and other parts of the cytoskeleton. Hameroff argued that these subneuronal cytoskeleton components could be the basic units of processing rather than the neurons themselves. The book was primarily concerned with information processing, with consciousness a secondary consideration.

Separately from Hameroff, the English mathematical physicist Roger Penrose had published his first book on consciousness, The Emperor's New Mind, in 1989. On the basis of Gödel's incompleteness theorems, he argued that the brain could perform functions that no computer or system of algorithms could. From this it could follow that consciousness itself might be fundamentally non-algorithmic and therefore impossible to model as a classical Turing machine type of computer. This conflicts with the idea that consciousness is explainable mechanistically, the prevailing view among neuroscientists and those artificial intelligence researchers who support the "Strong AI" hypothesis as in the Chinese room thought experiment.

Penrose saw the principles of quantum theory as providing an alternative process through which consciousness could arise. He further argued that this non-algorithmic process required a new form of the quantum wave reduction, later given the name objective reduction (OR), which could link the brain to the fundamental spacetime geometry.

Hameroff was inspired by Penrose's book to contact Penrose regarding his own theories about the mechanism of anesthesia, and how it specifically targets consciousness via action on neural microtubules. The two met in 1992, and Hameroff suggested that the microtubules were a good candidate site for a quantum mechanism in the brain. Penrose was interested in the mathematical features of the microtubule lattice, and over the next two years the two collaborated in formulating the orchestrated objective reduction (Orch-OR) model of consciousness. Following this collaboration, Penrose published his second consciousness book, Shadows of the Mind (1994).

Over the years since 1994, Hameroff has been active in promoting the Orch-OR model of consciousness through his web site and lectures.

== Criticism ==
Hameroff and Penrose's model has been met with skepticism from many disciplines. Rick Grush and Patricia Churchland, argued that "physiological evidence indicates that consciousness does not directly depend on microtubule properties in any case".

In 2000, physicist Max Tegmark calculated that quantum states in microtubules would survive for only 10^{−13} seconds, too brief to be of any significance for neural processes. Hameroff and the physicists Scott Hagan and Jack Tuszynski replied to Tegmark arguing that microtubules could be shielded against the environment of the brain and that Tegmark had used his own criteria for the reduction of the wavefunction, and did not use Penrose's OR, which is the basic assumption behind the whole theory. Christof Koch and Klaus Hepp also agreed that quantum coherence does not play, or does not need to play any major role in neurophysiology. Koch and Hepp concluded that "[t]he empirical demonstration of slowly decoherent and controllable quantum bits in neurons connected by electrical or chemical synapses, or the discovery of an efficient quantum algorithm for computations performed by the brain, would do much to bring these speculations from the 'far-out' to the mere 'very unlikely'." In 2022, a group of Italian physicists conducted several experiments that failed to provide evidence in support of a gravity-related quantum collapse model of consciousness, weakening the possibility of a quantum explanation for consciousness.

== Toward a science of consciousness ==
Hameroff was the lead organizer of the first Tucson Toward a Science of Consciousness meeting in 1994 that brought together approximately 300 people interested in consciousness studies (e.g., David Chalmers, Christof Koch, Bernard Baars, Roger Penrose, Benjamin Libet). Hameroff remains co-organizer of this influential annual conference (now simply Science of Consciousness). The first conference is widely regarded as a landmark event within the field of consciousness studies, and by bringing researchers from various disciplines together led to various useful synergies, resulting indirectly, for instance, in the formation of the Association for the Scientific Study of Consciousness, and more directly in the creation of the Center for Consciousness Studies at the University of Arizona, of which Hameroff is now the director. The Center for Consciousness Studies hosts meetings on the study of consciousness every two years, as well as sponsoring seminars on consciousness theory. The conference was described by the Chronicle of Higher Education as "the Stuart Show", and that its "anything goes" atmosphere is damaging the credibility of the field.

In 2006, Hameroff participated in the first Beyond Belief conference, where his theories were criticized by Lawrence Krauss, among others.

== Film ==
Hameroff appeared as himself in the documentary film What tнe ♯$*! Do ωΣ (k)πow!? (2004). He serves as producer, writer and scientific advisor to an independent feature film called Mindville. Mindville is a feature-length motion picture that combines live action with animation and effects to present a journey into the mysteries of human consciousness.

Hameroff has been interviewed in season 2, episode 1 of Through the Wormhole.
