= Michael Talbot (author) =

American novelist

- Born: September 29, 1953; Grand Rapids, Michigan, US
- Died: May 27, 1992 (aged 38); New York City, US
- Education: Michigan State University
- Writing career
- Subject: quantum mysticism
- Notable works: Mysticism and the New Physics; The Holographic Universe

Michael Coleman Talbot (September 29, 1953 – May 27, 1992) was an American author of fiction and non-fiction. He wrote several books highlighting parallels between ancient mysticism and quantum mechanics, and espousing a theoretical model of reality that suggests the physical universe is akin to a hologram based on the research and conclusions of David Bohm and Karl H. Pribram. According to Talbot ESP, telepathy, and other paranormal phenomena are a product of this holographic model of reality. Talbot also wrote several horror novels.

== Early life ==
Talbot was born in Grand Rapids, Michigan, on September 29, 1953, and grew up in nearby Lowell. He attended Michigan State University from 1971 to 1974 where he pursued an eclectic education. While he did quite a bit of writing at the time, he was also engaged in many other efforts. He taught himself how to play the piano by locking himself in piano rooms for long periods. He was a great fan of Scriabin. He spent quite a bit of time painting, and made friends with faculty in Art History to discuss art and culture. As a young man he had a great interest in the occult, which allowed him to spend hours entertaining small groups of friends with tales of poltergeists, UFOs and similar phenomena.

== Career ==
He was originally a fiction and science fiction author. He also contributed articles to The Village Voice and other publications.

Talbot attempted to incorporate spirituality, religion and science to shed light on profound questions. His non-fiction books include Mysticism And The New Physics, Beyond The Quantum, and The Holographic Universe (freely available at the Internet Archive).

== Personal life and death ==
Talbot was openly gay and lived with his boyfriend. In 1992, Talbot died of lymphocytic leukemia at age 38.

== Bibliography ==
Novels

- The Delicate Dependency, 1982 (reprinted in 2014 by Valancourt Books), ISBN 1941147240
- The Bog, 1986 (reprinted in 2015 by Valancourt Books)
- Night Things, 1988 (reprinted in 2015 by Valancourt Books)

Non-fiction

- Mysticism And The New Physics, ISBN 0-14-019328-6, 1980 (rev. 1992)
- Beyond The Quantum, ISBN 0-553-34480-3, 1986
- Your Past Lives - A Reincarnation Handbook, 1987, ISBN 0517563010
- The Holographic Universe, ISBN 0-06-092258-3, 1991

== See also ==
- Holographic principle
- Holonomic brain theory
