= Equipotentiality =

Equipotentiality refers to a psychological theory in both neuropsychology and behaviorism. Karl Spencer Lashley defined equipotentiality as "The apparent capacity of any intact part of a functional brain to carry out… the [memory] functions which are lost by the destruction of [other parts]". In other words, the brain can co-opt other areas to take over the role of the damaged part. Equipotentiality is subject to the other term Lashley coined, the law of mass action. The law of mass action says that the efficiency of any complex function of the brain is reduced proportionately to how much damage the brain as a whole has sustained, but not to the damage of any particular area of the brain. In this context when we use our brains we are referring to the cortex.

== Historical context ==
In the 1800s brain localization theories were the popular theories on how the brain functioned. The Broca's area of speech was discovered in 1861, in 1870 the cerebral cortex was marked as the motor center of the brain, and the general visual and auditory areas were defined in the cerebral cortex. Behaviorism at the time would also say that learned responses were series of specific connections in the cerebral cortex. Lashley argued that one would then be able to locate these connections in part of the brain and he systematically looked for where learning was localized.

== Experiments ==
While working on his PhD in genetics, Lashley began a number of tests on brain tissue and the idea of localization. Lashley wanted to focus mainly on behaviors that could be observed and an easy way to do that was to study white rats in a controlled setting. A fellow researcher, Shepherd Ivory Franz, also shared the common interest of studying localization and studying only things that could be observed. Franz had already done previous work with lesions in cat brains and puzzle boxes so Lashley and Franz decided to team up and work with rats.

In their first experiments, Lashley was in charge of building different mazes for the rats to go through and Franz was in charge of making the lesions in the rats' brains. What Lashley and Franz had both observed before the lesions was that their rats became better and better at getting through the mazes to find food and they were testing if lesions had an influence on the rats' memory and ability to get through the mazes. Franz made multiple lesions in specific parts of the brains and after they healed, put them through the maze to see if they had deficits in finding the food. What they found was that the mice had no deficits finding the food if the lesions were in a specific part of the brain but if the lesions damaged a large portion of the brain, they did have troubles finding food.

This would suggest that just one part of the brain is not responsible for memory and localization was totally ruled out. What they concluded was that multiple parts of the brain work together for memory and retention. They also found that rats with lesions in a small specific area had functioning sensory systems and it seemed that when parts of the brain were damaged for a certain action, other parts of the brain were compensating so those actions could be carried out. Lashley coined the term equipotentiality to define the idea that if one part of the brain is damaged, other parts of the brain will carry out the memory functions for that damaged part.

"The apparent capacity of any intact part of a functional brain to carry out… the [memory] functions which are lost by the destruction of [other parts]". Another way of putting this is, the brain has the ability to use any functioning part of the brain to do what a damaged part of the brain no longer can do. Equipotentiality is subject to the other term Lashley coined the mass action principle. This principle postulates that the efficiency of any complex function of the brain is reduced proportionately to how much damage the brain as a whole has sustained, but not to the damage of any particular area of the brain. In this context when we use brain we are referring to the cortex.

Ghiselli and Brown conducted an experiment where they destroyed various subcortical regions of the brain in rats and tested their abilities to learn mazes compared to rats with no damage done to their brains. The rats with damaged brains didn't learn as well as the control rats, but no particular region seemed to be necessary to learn the mazes. There has also been experimental work done on higher apes and also studies done on humans who have suffered brain damage in various ways. The data gathered from these tend to confirm Lashley's theories.

Using the idea of equipotentiality we can explain how someone who's received damage to a specific part of their brain can relearn how to perform actions that were lost due to brain damage. Since the area of the brain that was originally performing this function is damaged and unusable, the brain compensates and can code that information in other parts of the brain. Through Lashley's ideas of equipotentiality and the law of mass action, he is saying that the brain is functioning as a whole unit and that overall damage to the brain affects its overall functioning. This starts to go against localization theories which would say that the brain is only functioning in specific regions and the brain's ability to perform at any given task is only affected by the overall damage to that area of the brain and damage to an unrelated area shouldn't affect the task. However, equipotentiality and the law of mass action don't mean that there is no localization. There are certain functions that have been pinned to specific parts of the brain, language and the senses for example, but for things like learning or behavior there is no specific area identified yet, and these are the brain activities that have the flexibility to be coded in different areas of the brain after damage has been sustained.

=== In neuropsychology ===
In neuropsychology, equipotentiality is a neurological principle that describes a cortical mechanism, first identified by Jean Pierre Flourens and later revisited by Karl Lashley in the 1950s. After performing ablation experiments on birds, and seeing that they could still fly, peck, mate, sleep, and perform a range of other regular behaviors, Flourens concluded that every area of the brain was capable of doing what every other area of the brain could, but only for higher-level functions which he called "perception". He also argued that elementary sensory input was localized, which is supported by current research. The famous saying that we only use 10% of our brains originates from Flourens, back about a century and a half ago.

Lashley offered two generalizations from his research, that recently have been successfully challenged but nonetheless represent important milestones in the development of neurological theory:

1. Although surgical removal of a portion of the cortex can produce significant behavioral deficits, those deficits can be recovered through additional training and time, by way of the development of new neuronal connections. Lashley argued that the brain is sufficiently plastic, such that when one region of the brain is surgically removed (or damaged through injury) another region takes over the damaged region's function. This is the principle Lashley referred to as equipotentiality. Extensive regions of the cerebral cortex have the potentiality for mediating specific learning and memory functions.
2. His principle of "mass action" stated that the cerebral cortex acts as one—as a whole—in many types of learning.

== Contributions ==
Lashley contributed to psychology and neuropsychology in a number of ways. First, his publication, Brain Mechanisms and Intelligence: A Quantitative Study of Injuries to the Brain (1929) found evidence to suggest the idea of localization was wrong and brought to life the idea that the brain and its multiple parts work together for memory and other functions. Second, researchers began to copy his studies and also started to investigate what parts of the brain work together. They also began studying deficits people may have along with parts of their brain that may be damaged to see if there is a correlation between them.

Lashley was also a pioneer in challenging the way we think about human and animal behavior in terms of our biology. Lashley found with further experimentation that behavior is not just a reaction to a stimulus but a large and complicated series of connections made in the brain. An input of information or stimuli occurs and connections occur in the brain which leads to the output or behavior. Researchers also expanded the study of working memory, central executive, and further research on memory deficits and learning.

Lashley did not find a central place for stored memories, which suggests that stored memories are not localized but stored and retrieved in multiple areas. Lashley contributed to studies on Alzheimer's disease and deficits in memory, behavior, and thinking in those who have Alzheimer's disease. Cell-to-cell communication slowly degrades in Alzheimer's disease and Lashley's contributions to psychology, neuropsychology and biology have helped with the understanding of this and many other diseases and disorders.

== People Lashley influenced ==
Karl Lashley worked with Donald Hebb in The Yerkes Laboratories; a lab that worked with monkeys to study various psychological concepts. Another man that Lashley influenced was Roger Sperry. He also studied with Lashley in the lab and eventually received the Karl Lashley Award of the American Philosophical Society.

== See also ==
- Neuroplasticity
- Eric Kandel
