= Karl H. Pribram =

Austrian neuroscientist (1919–2015)

- Born: February 25, 1919; Vienna, Austria
- Died: January 19, 2015 (aged 95); Virginia, United States
- Education: University of Chicago (B.S., 1938; M.D., 1941) Culver Military Academy (Man of the Year)
- Spouses: Helen Bermingham Pribram; Amy Isle Pribram; Katherine Neville
- Scientific career
- Fields: Cognitive Psychology, Cognitive science, Cognitive revolution, Neuropsychology, Holonomic brain theory, Holographic consciousness
- Workplaces: Yale University, Stanford University, Radford University, Georgetown University, George Mason University
- Doctoral students: Lawrence Weiskrantz; Walter Jackson Freeman III; Mortimer Mishkin
- Other notable students: Leslie Ungerleider
- Website: karlpribram.com

Karl Harry Pribram ([ˈpr̝̊iːbram]) (February 25, 1919 – January 19, 2015) was an American-Austrian researcher in the fields of cognitive psychology, cognitive science, neuropsychology, holonomic brain theory, and holographic consciousness. He was a professor at Georgetown University and an emeritus professor at Stanford University at the time of his death. Before moving to Georgetown, he was the James P. and Anna King Distinguished Professor at Radford University. He was best known for his work on the holonomic brain theory.

== Major Contributions ==
=== Cognitive revolution in psychology ===
Plans and the Structure of Behavior (1960), co-written with George Armitage Miller and Eugene Galanter, is widely credited as a seminal work in the development of the field of cognitive psychology. This work fueled the cognitive revolution, which established cognitive psychology as the dominant trend in psychology, replacing behaviorism.

=== Emotional processes and the limbic system ===
In the late 1940s and early 1950s, Pribram became "recognized for pioneering research defining the boundaries of the limbic system." Through more than 50 surgical experiments, Pribram's laboratory was able to establish that the limbic system, governing emotions, also interacted with the executive functions of the prefrontal cortex, governing personality, decision making, and social behavior. He discovered the "sensory specific" functions of the Association cortex, revealing that these systems organize the choices we make among sensory inputs, which supports higher order cognitive processes, such as perception, language and thought.

In 1958, Pribram coined the term "the Four F's" ("Feeding, Fighting, Fleeing and Sex") to describe the functions of the fronto-limbic system (the limbic system including the pre-frontal and association cortex). Additionally, through extensive laboratory testing with primates, Pribram and his students discovered that removal of the amygdala from these systems affected this set of behaviors, resulting in reset of hierarchical relationships within the group.

=== Sensory processes and memory ===
Pribram's work Brain and Perception: Holonomy and Structure in Figural Processing (1991) conveyed his theory, based on experimental evidence, that sensory perception, along with memory storage and retrieval, is processed through dendritic fields, in a manner similar to quantum field theory.

Pribram describes his discovery, through extensive experiments with graduate students Mortimer Mishkin, John Robert Anderson, and Leslie Ungerleider, of the importance of the inferior temporal cortex's role in vision. Until this discovery, the temporal lobe was thought to be devoted to hearing.

In Brain and Perception, Pribram also addresses the longstanding question of whether brain functions are distributed or localized. He "emphasizes the fact that both distributed (holistic) and localized (structural) processes characterize brain function." He further analyzes wave-type input received by our senses (touch, taste, smell, sound and sight) through lens-like receptors (e.g., the cochlea for sound waves).

Pribram provides models of his experimental data, developed with the Japanese mathematical physicists Kunio Yasue and Mari Jibu, in order to demonstrate how we receive, perceive, and retrieve information from the outside world ("navigate" our world).

=== Holonomic model ===
Karl Pribram first explored the metaphor of information storage in the brain as a hologram in his Languages of the Brain: Experimental Paradoxes and Principles in Neuropsychology (1971). In a 1974 review of Languages, in Behavioral Science Journal, R.P McDermott and Laurence Mucciolo stated "The book's contribution to neuropsychology will be hailed, developed and disputed for years to come."

Pribram's holonomic model of brain processing is further developed in Brain and Perception: Holonomy and Structure in Figural Processing (1991), which contains the extension of his work with David Bohm, as well as numerous quantum and mathematical physicists. This theory - derived from 40 years of laboratory experiments and hundreds of tests - demonstrates the following: that certain brain processes, such as memory, do not take place solely through the axons, synapses, or reflex-type actions but rather through a concerted, ever-changing process that operates similarly to quantum field theory. Processing occurs in the neuron's felt-like fields of fine-fibered dendrites (branches), as well as in the dynamic electrical fields that surround these dendrites.

Hence, Karl Pribram's holonomic brain theory demonstrates that some brain processes are distributed (non-localized) in the form of interference wave patterns, and can interact on a quantum level. Pribram based his initial theory on the Fourier Transform, which enables one to analyze any repeated wave-form. After numerous conversations with Nobel Laureate Gábor Dénes [Dennis Gabor] inventor of holography, Pribram expanded his model to incorporate Gabor's holographic model of information storage into Pribram's holonomic theory of brain processing.

=== The past and future of brain research ===
Pribram's last important publication, published two years before his death, is The Form Within: My Point of View (2013). In this scientific memoir, Pribram describes 200 years of the interrelationships among the fields of brain research, neuroscience, psychology, and philosophy, coupled with his personal insights derived from 75 years of active participation in all of these fields. Pribram shares his hands-on research, as well as his publications with colleagues over the decades, and his intimate interactions with well-known figures in philosophy, psychology, physics, and neuroscience, including: Nobel Laureates Sir John Eccles, Ilya Prigogine, Dennis Gabor, Francis Crick, Hubel and Wiesel; and scientists such as B. F. Skinner, Wolfgang Kohler, Karl Lashley, Aleksandr Romanovitch Luria, Eugene Sokolov, David Bohm, and many others.

The Form Within is described by the Journal of Integrative Neuroscience as, "... an amazingly clear, voluminously detailed, yet easily accessible description of [Pribram's] experiments over the past seven decades in neurocognition by man and animals."

== Career ==
=== Private practice and Yerkes ===
In the 1940s, Pribram became one of the first 300 board-certified neurosurgeons in the world after receiving his MD from University of Chicago at the age of 22. During his education and residency, he studied under or collaborated with such luminaries as Anton Carlson, Ralph Gerard, Percival Bailey, and Warren McCullock. At Chicago Memorial Hospital Pribram was the first resident under Paul Bucy, the pioneer in the study of the temporal lobe, which later influenced Pribram's discoveries in that field. Bucy arranged for Pribram to complete his residency with Eric Oldberg, the last of Harvey Cushing's residents who received individual training by Cushing.

Throughout his life, Pribram would engage in pioneering work on the definition of the limbic system, the relationship of the frontal cortex to the limbic system, the sensory-specific association cortex of the parietal and temporal lobes, and the classical motor cortex of the human brain.

During his first ten years of residency and as a practicing brain surgeon in Memphis, TN, and Jacksonville, FL, Pribram became concerned about the then-accepted practice of lobotomy and set out to discover the true function of the frontal lobes, which was unknown at that time. This quest led Pribram into the field of brain research, which resulted in the discovery that the frontal lobes are the critical "executors" of the brain.

While still in private practice as a surgeon in Florida, Pribram simultaneously offered his services to Karl Lashley at the Yerkes Primate Center (Yerkes Laboratories of Primate Biology), and there continued his research into the relationship between brain function and mental processes. Lashley shared techniques and disciplines in the field of experimental psychology, while Pribram "added neurosurgical sophistication" and sterility practices to the field of primate neurological research. Pribram's colleagues at Yerkes included Roger Sperry and Donald Hebb. Shortly after the end of WWII, Pribram succeeded Lashley as director of Yerkes; under his tenure the field of animal neuropsychology expanded and flourished.

These early years would prove to be influential in Pribram's development of theories about the structure of the brain and related mental processes. Two of the earliest discoveries Pribram made while at Yerkes were as follows: 1) the relationship between the frontal cortex (personality, decision making, and social behavior) and the limbic forebrain (emotions); and 2) the functions of the posterior cortex (visual processing, spatial reasoning, and memory).

=== Yale University and the Institute of Living (1948-1959) ===
In 1948, Pribram was invited by Professor John Fulton (author of Physiology of the Nervous System) to join the Department of Physiology at Yale University. Pribram began his research there focusing on understanding the functions of the inferior temporal lobe. This research led to Pribram's discoveries about the relationship between the anterior frontal cortex (decision-making and complex problem-solving) and the limbic forebrain (sensory processing). His colleagues, collaborators, and graduate students at Yale included Allan Mirsky, Hal Rosvold, Paul Maclean, Lawrence Kruger, Robert Livingston, and James Stevenson.

Additionally, Pribram worked with Wolfgang Köhler (Swarthmore/Dartmouth) to test Kohler's hypothesis of Direct Current as the basis for cortical processing. Pribram was able to demonstrate that there was indeed a Direct Current shift during visual (and auditory) stimulation.

While at Yale, Pribram established and directed the Psychophysiology Laboratory at the Institute of Living in Hartford, which "became a mecca for students intensely interested in the relationship between brain and behavior." As Director of the Psychophysiology Laboratory, Pribram would conduct some of the earliest research on brain circuitry. The years of this laboratory under Pribram's leadership has been called "The Golden Age of Primate Neuropsychology."

During this time, Pribram also established relationships with psychologists at Harvard University and "learned a great deal from S.S. Stevens, Gary Boring, and Georg von Bekesy." Additionally, Pribram noted that his collaboration with B.F. Skinner at Harvard, "led to a decade of primate operant conditioning experiments, which developed into subsequent research in cognitive neuropsychology." Pribram's further interactions and experiments with behavioral scientists ultimately led him to develop new areas of research that went beyond behaviorism, and looked instead to "the new neurology… a cognitive science which paid heed to the brain's control over its own input from the senses." This expanded approach to cognitive science is detailed in Plans and the Structure of Behavior (Galanter, Miller, Pribram, 1960), launching the "Cognitive Revolution."

Among his students at that time were Lawrence Weiskrantz, Walter Freeman III and Mortimer Mishkin.

=== Stanford University (1959-1989) ===
After his tenure at Yale, Pribram moved to the Center for Advanced Study in the Behavioral Sciences at Stanford University. For the next 30 years he taught neurophysiology and physiological psychology at Stanford with joint appointments in the Department of Psychiatry (Medical School Faculty) and of Psychology (Arts and Sciences Faculty).

During this time, Pribram pioneered the field of neuropsychology, leading groundbreaking research into the interrelations of the brain, behavior, and cognition.

At Stanford, a part-time secretary, Barbara Honegger, filed a complaint alleging that Pribram had "denied [her] a job rank she was entitled to" while further alleging that Pribram had "struck her in the head." Pribram was placed on temporary probation by Stanford, while Honegger received a parting out-of-court settlement from the school.

While a professor at Stanford, with joint appointments in the departments of Psychology and Psychiatry, Pribram was honored with a Lifetime Grant from the US Office of Naval Research as well as a Lifetime Research Career Award from the National Institutes of Health.

Upon becoming emeritus at Stanford University, Pribram accepted the position of the James P. and Anna King Distinguished Professor at Radford University and, in 1989, was appointed Eminent Scholar of the Commonwealth of Virginia. Radford built the Center for Brain Research and Informational Sciences (B.R.A.I.N.S.) for Pribram to direct with the support of Alastair Harris, chair of the psychology department.

After 60 years of leading research and development in the field of brain research, Pribram was appointed Distinguished Professor of Psychology and Cognitive Neuroscience at Georgetown University in 1998. Simultaneously, he was appointed Distinguished Professor in the Engineering and Computer Science Department at George Mason University.

== Influence on other researchers ==
Over fifty doctoral and fifty postdoctoral fellows were trained in the neuropsychological laboratories at Yale and Stanford under Pribram's direction.

During Pribram's tenure at Yale, while simultaneously directing the Psychophysiology Laboratory at the Institute for Living, many young researchers were able to explore the importance of utilizing psychology combined with neurophysiology, including Lawrence Weiskrantz (Harvard) and Mortimer Mishkin (McGill).

At Stanford, Leslie Ungerleider (noted experimental psychologist and neuroscientist) was among those who made major contributions.

== Accolades ==
Karl Pribram was the recipient of more than seventy major international awards and honors, including a Lifetime Grant from the US Office of Naval Research, the Lifetime Research Career Award from the National Institutes of Health, the Lifetime Achievement Award from the Society of Experimental Psychology, the Award for Distinguished Career in Science from the Washington Academy of Sciences, the Neural Network Leadership Award from the International Neural Network Society, and the Outstanding Contributions Award from the American Board of Medical Psychotherapists.

He was granted an Honorary Doctorate in Psychology from the University of Montreal, Canada, and an Honorary Doctorate in Neuroscience from the University of Bremen, Germany.

Pribram was presented the inaugural Dagmar and Vaclav Havel Award (The VIZE 97 Prize) in 1999 for uniting the sciences and the humanities. The award was created to honor significant individuals whose work transcends the conventional framework of scientific understanding. Vaclav Havel, President of the Czech Republic, declared, "[Pribram] is an example to people of different fields and orientations, such as neurologists, psychologists, mathematicians, scientists and philosophers. It is a wonder to see people from all over the world united by one purpose when so often the world is divided by distrust and small disparities."

=== Selected Honors and Awards ===
- Lifetime Grant, US Office of Naval Research
- Lifetime Research Career Award, National Institutes of Health (1962)
- Lifetime Achievement Award, Society of Experimental Psychology
- President of the International Neuropsychological Society (1967)
- American Psychological Association
  - Division of Physiological and Comparative Psychology (President, 1967–1968)
  - Division of Theological and Philosophical Psychology (President, 1979–1980)
- Menfred Sakel Award, Society for Biological Psychiatry (1976)
- Realia Honor, Institute for Advanced Philosophic Research (1986)
- Outstanding Contributions Award, American Board of Medical Psychotherapists (1990)
- Honorary Ph.D. in psychology, University of Montreal, Canada (1992)
- Neural Network Leadership Award, International Neural Network Society (1994)
- Honorary Ph.D. in neuroscience, University of Bremen, Germany (1996)
- The Noetic Medal of Consciousness & Brain Research (1998)
- First recipient of the Dagmar and Vaclav Havel Award: The VIZE 97 Prize (1999)
- Culver Man of the Year, Culver Military Academy (2000)
- Award for Distinguished Career in Science, Washington Academy of Sciences (2010)

== In popular culture ==
=== The Holographic Universe ===
Michael Talbot opened the acknowledgements section of his work with the note, "David Bohm, Ph.D., and Karl Pribram, Ph.D., who were generous with both their time and their ideas, and without whose work this book would not have been written."

=== The Aquarian Conspiracy ===
Marilyn Ferguson summarized and interpreted Karl Pribram's holonomic model of brain processing in her popular book, The Aquarian Conspiracy (1980). In the book she also describes how Pribram's son, John Pribram, Ph.D., introduced him to the work of David Bohm, leading to the further development of Pribram's holonomic brain theory. Additionally, Ferguson produced the Brain/Mind Bulletin, a science newsletter dedicated to sharing cutting-edge research from prominent scientists and theorists including Pribram, Bohm, and Prigogine.

=== SyberVision ===
Steve DeVore, the founder of SyberVision, worked as a research assistant to Pribram at Stanford, where he would investigate the function of mirror neurons. Together they published The Neuropsychology of Achievement which proposed the concept of creating an "image of achievement" to attain one's goals.

=== Feldenkrais Foundation ===
While at Stanford, Pribram was introduced to Dr. Moshé Feldenkrais, the founder of the Feldenkrais Method. Pribram would later visit Feldenkrais' training program in California where they engaged in a series of conversations focused on the holographic and dynamic qualities of brain functioning.

== Selected books ==
- Hamburg, D. A., Pribram, K. H., and Stunkard, A. J. (Eds.) (1970) Perception and Its Disorders. Baltimore: Williams and Wilkins.
- Hyden, H., Lorenz, K., Magoun, H.W., Penfield, W., and Pribram, K.H. (Eds) (1969) On the Biology of Learning. New York: Harcourt, Brace and World, Inc.
- King, J. S., and Pribram, K.H., (Eds.) (1995) Scale in Conscious Experience: Is the Brain Too Important to be Left to Specialists to Study?, New Jersey: Lawrence Erlbaum Associates, Inc. ISBN 0-8058-2178-3
- Miller, G. A., Galanter, E., and Pribram, K. H. (1960) Plans and the Structure of Behavior. New York: Henry Holt, 1960. (Russian trans; also in Japanese, German, Spanish, Italian.) ISBN 0-03-010075-5
- Isaacson, R. L., and Pribram, K. H. (Eds.) (1975) The Hippocampus, Volumes I and II. New York: Plenum. ISBN 0-306-37535-4
- Isaacson, R. L., and Pribram, K. H. (Eds.) (1986) The Hippocampus, Volumes III and IV. New York: Plenum.
- Pribram, K. H., and Broadbent, D. (Eds.) (1970) Biology of Memory. New York: Academic Press. ISBN 0-12-564350-0
- Pribram, K. H., and Gill, M. M. (1976) Freud's `Project' Re-Assessed: Preface to Contemporary Cognitive Theory and Neuropsychology. New York: Basic Books. ISBN 0-465-02569-2
- Pribram, K.H., and King, J.S. (Eds.) (1996) Learning as Self-Organization. New Jersey: Lawrence Erlbaum Associates, Inc. ISBN 0-8058-2586-X
- Pribram, K. H., and Luria, A. R. (Eds.) (1973) Psychophysiology of the Frontal Lobes. New York: Academic Press. ISBN 0-12-564340-3
- Pribram, K.H., and Ramirez, J.M. (1980) Cerebro, Mente y Holograma. Madrid: Alhambra.
- Pribram, K. H. (Ed.) (1969) Brain and Behavior, Volumes I-IV. London: Penguin, Ltd. ISBN 0-14-080521-4
- Pribram, K. H. (1971) What Makes Man Human. (39th James Arthur Lecture on the Evolution of the Human Brain, 1970). New York: American Museum of Natural History.
- Pribram, K. H. (1971) Languages of the Brain: Experimental Paradoxes and Principles in Neuropsychology. Englewood Cliffs, NJ: Prentice-Hall; Monterey, CA: Brooks/Cole, 1977; New York: Brandon House, 1982. (Translations in Russian, Japanese, Italian, Spanish)
- Pribram, K. H. (Ed.) (1974) Central Processing of Sensory Input. The Neurosciences: Third Study Program. Cambridge, MA: MIT Press.
- Pribram, K. H. (1991) Brain and Perception: Holonomy and Structure in Figural Processing. New Jersey: Lawrence Erlbaum Associates, Inc. ISBN 978-0-89859-995-4
- Pribram, K.H. (Ed.) (1993) Rethinking Neural Networks: Quantum Fields and Biological Data. New Jersey: Lawrence Erlbaum Associates, Inc. ISBN 0-8058-1466-3
- Pribram, K.H. (Ed.) (1994) Origins: Brain & Self Organization. New Jersey: Lawrence Erlbaum Associates, Inc. ISBN 978-1-138-87652-1
- Pribram, K.H. (1995) Cerebro Y Conciencia. Madrid, Spain: Diaz de Santos.
- Pribram, K.H. (Ed.) (1998) Brain and Values: Is a Biological Science of Values Possible. Hillsdale, NJ: Lawrence Erlbaum Associates. ISBN 0-8058-3154-1
- Pribram, K.H. (2013) The Form Within. Prospecta Press. ISBN 978-1-935212-80-5
