= Holographic theory =

Holographic theory may refer to:

- The holographic principle - a concept in physics whereby a space is considered as a hologram of n-1 dimensions.
- The holographic paradigm - a concept in quantum mysticism, wherein the holographic principle is conjectured to be fundamental to physics, and by extension to human cognition and perception.
