= A/S ratio =

The A/S ratio is the proportion of the brain not directly connected with either receptor inputs or motor outputs, where A is the association cortex and S is the sensory cortex. The A/S ratio can be measured for any organism with a brain, and the higher the A/S ratio, the more complex the brain is.

It was proposed by Donald Hebb in 1949.
