= The Computational Brain =

1992 book by Patricia Churchland and Terrence J. Sejnowski

The Computational Brain is a book by Patricia Churchland and Terrence J. Sejnowski and published in 1992 by The MIT Press, Cambridge, Massachusetts, ISBN 0-262-03188-4. It has cover blurbs by Karl Pribram, Francis Crick, and Carver Mead.
