= Mass action =

Mass action may refer to:

- Law of mass action, in chemistry, a postulate of reactions
- Mass action law (electronics), in semiconductor electronics, a relationship between intrinsic and doped carrier concentrations
- Mass action (sociology), in sociology, a term for situations in which a large number of people behave simultaneously in similar ways individually and without coordination
- Mass Action Principle (neuroscience), in neuroscience, the belief that memory and learning are distributed and can't be isolated within any one area of the brain
- Mass tort, or mass action, in law, which is when plaintiffs form a group to sue a defendant (for similar alleged harms)
