= Leslie Ungerleider =

American neuroscientist

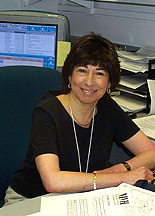
- Born: April 17, 1946; New York City, U.S.
- Died: December 11, 2020 (aged 74); Silver Spring, Maryland, U.S.
- Education: B.A., Binghamton University, Ph.D. in experimental psychology, New York University, postdoctoral fellowship with Karl Pribram, Stanford University
- Occupations: experimental psychologist and neuroscientist
- Employer(s): Chief of the Laboratory of Brain and Cognition, National Institute of Mental Health
- Organization(s): National Academy of Sciences, American Academy of Arts and Sciences, Institute of Medicine of the National Academy of Sciences, Society of Experimental Psychologists
- Known for: Introducing the concepts of the dorsal and ventral streams
- Awards: Women in Neuroscience Lifetime Achievement Award, 2001; NIH Distinguished Investigator, 2008, William James Fellow Award, Association for Psychological Science, 2009, University of Louisville Grawemeyer Award for Psychology, 2012

Leslie G. Ungerleider (April 17, 1946 – December 11, 2020) was an experimental psychologist and neuroscientist, previously Chief of the Laboratory of Brain and Cognition at the National Institute of Mental Health. Ungerleider was known for introducing the concepts of the dorsal (where) and ventral (what) streams, two pathways of information processing in the brain that specialize in visuospatial processing and object recognition, respectively.

Ungerleider received a B.A. from Binghamton University and a Ph.D. in experimental psychology from New York University, and she completed a postdoctoral fellowship with Karl Pribram at Stanford University, where she began her work on higher-order perceptual mechanisms in the cortex of primates. In 1975 she moved to the National Institute of Mental Health, where she remained for the remainder of her career, initially joining Mortimer Mishkin in the Laboratory of Neuropsychology and establishing her own laboratory in 1995. In 2001, she was the recipient of the Women in Neuroscience Lifetime Achievement Award and in 2008 she became an NIH Distinguished Investigator. L. Ungerleider and M. Mishkin won the 2012 University of Louisville Grawemeyer Award for Psychology.

Ungerleider was elected to the National Academy of Sciences (2000), the American Academy of Arts and Sciences (2000) the Institute of Medicine of the National Academy of Sciences (2001), and the Society of Experimental Psychologists. In 2009 she received the William James Fellow Award by the Association for Psychological Science in recognition of how her research 'advanced our understanding of brain function and its relevance to public health' and also for her mentorship of young researchers as an outstanding lecturer.
