= Sequence learning =

Method of human learning

In cognitive psychology, sequence learning is inherent to human ability because it is an integrated part of conscious and nonconscious learning as well as activities. Sequences of information or sequences of actions are used in various everyday tasks: "from sequencing sounds in speech, to sequencing movements in typing or playing instruments, to sequencing actions in driving an automobile." Sequence learning can be used to study skill acquisition and in studies of various groups ranging from neuropsychological patients to infants. According to Ritter and Nerb, “The order in which material is presented can strongly influence what is learned, how fast performance increases, and sometimes even whether the material is learned at all.” Sequence learning, more known and understood as a form of explicit learning, is now also being studied as a form of implicit learning as well as other forms of learning. Sequence learning can also be referred to as sequential behavior, behavior sequencing, and serial order in behavior.

== History ==
In the first half of the 20th century, Margaret Floy Washburn, John B. Watson, and other behaviorists believed behavioral sequencing to be governed by the reflex chain, which states that stimulation caused by an initial movement triggers an additional movement, which triggers another additional movement, and so on. In 1951, Karl Lashley, a neurophysiologist at Harvard University, published “The Problem of Serial Order in Behavior,” addressing the current beliefs about sequence learning and introducing his hypothesis. He criticized the previous view on the basis of six lines of evidence:

The first line is that movements can occur even when sensory feedback is interrupted. The second is that some movement sequences occur too quickly for elements of the sequences to be triggered by feedback from the preceding elements. Next is that the errors in behavior suggest internal plans for what will be done later. Also, the time to initiate a movement sequence can increase with the length or complexity of the sequence. The next line is the properties of movements occurring early in a sequence can anticipate later features. Then lastly the neural activity can indicate preparation of upcoming behavior events, including upcoming behavior events in the relatively long-term future.

Lashley argued that sequence learning, or behavioral sequencing or serial order in behavior, is not attributable to sensory feedback. Rather, he proposed that there are plans for behavior since the nervous system prepares for some behaviors but not others. He said that there was a hierarchical organization of plans. He came up with several lines of evidence. The first of these is that the context changes functional interpretations of the same behaviors, such as the way “wright, right, right, rite, and write” are interpreted based on the context of the sentence. “Right” can be interpreted as a direction or as something good depending on the context. A second line of evidence says that errors are involved in human behavior as hierarchical organization. In addition, “hierarchical organization of plans comes from the timing of behavioral sequences.” The larger the phrase, the longer the response time, which factors into “decoding” or “unpacking” hierarchical plans. Additional evidence is how easy or hard it is to learn a sequence. The mind can create a “memory for what is about to happen” as well as a “memory for what has happened.” The final evidence for the hierarchical organization of plans is characterized by "chunking". This skill combines multiple units into larger units.

== Types of sequence learning ==
There are two broad categories of sequence learning—explicit and implicit—with subcategories. Explicit sequence learning has been known and studied since the discovery of sequence learning. However, recently, implicit sequence learning has gained more attention and research. As a form of implicit learning, implicit sequence learning concerns underlying learning methods of which people are unaware—in other words, learning without knowing. The exact properties and number of mechanisms of implicit learning are debated. Other forms of implicit sequence learning include motor sequence learning, temporal sequence learning, and associative sequence learning.

== Sequence learning problems ==
Sequence learning problems are used to better understand the different types of sequence learning. There are four basic sequence learning problems: sequence prediction, sequence generation, sequence recognition, and sequential decision making. These “problems” show how sequences are formulated. They show the patterns sequences follow and how these different sequence learning problems are related to each other.

Sequence prediction attempts to predict the next immediate element of a sequence based on all the preceding elements. Sequence generation is basically the same as sequence prediction: an attempt to piece together a sequence one by one the way it naturally occurs. Sequence recognition takes certain criteria and determines whether the sequence is legitimate. Sequential decision making or sequence generation through actions breaks down into three variations: goal-oriented, trajectory-oriented, and reinforcement-maximizing. These three variations all want to pick the action(s) or step(s) that will lead to the goal in the future.

These sequence learning problems reflect hierarchical organization of plans because each element in the sequences builds on the previous elements.

In a classic experiment published in 1967, Alfred L. Yarbus demonstrated that though subjects viewing portraits reported apprehending the portrait as a whole, their eye movements successively fixated on the most informative parts of the image. These observations suggest that underlying an apparently parallel process of face perception, a serial oculomotor process is concealed. It is a common observation that when a skill is being acquired, we are more attentive in the initial phase, but after repeated practice, the skill becomes nearly automatic; this is also known as unconscious competence. We can then concentrate on learning a new action while performing previously learned actions skillfully. Thus, it appears that a neural code or representation for the learned skill is created in our brain, which is usually called procedural memory. The procedural memory encodes procedures or algorithms rather than facts.

== Ongoing research ==
There are many other areas of application for sequence learning. How humans learn sequential procedures has been a long-standing research problem in cognitive science and currently is a major topic in neuroscience. Research work has been going on in several disciplines, including artificial intelligence, neural networks, and engineering. For a philosophical perspective, see Inductive reasoning and Problem of induction. For a theoretical computer-science perspective, see Solomonoff's theory of inductive inference and Inductive programming. For a mathematical perspective, see Extrapolation.
