= Hebb–Williams maze =

Maze used to measure cognitive ability of small animals

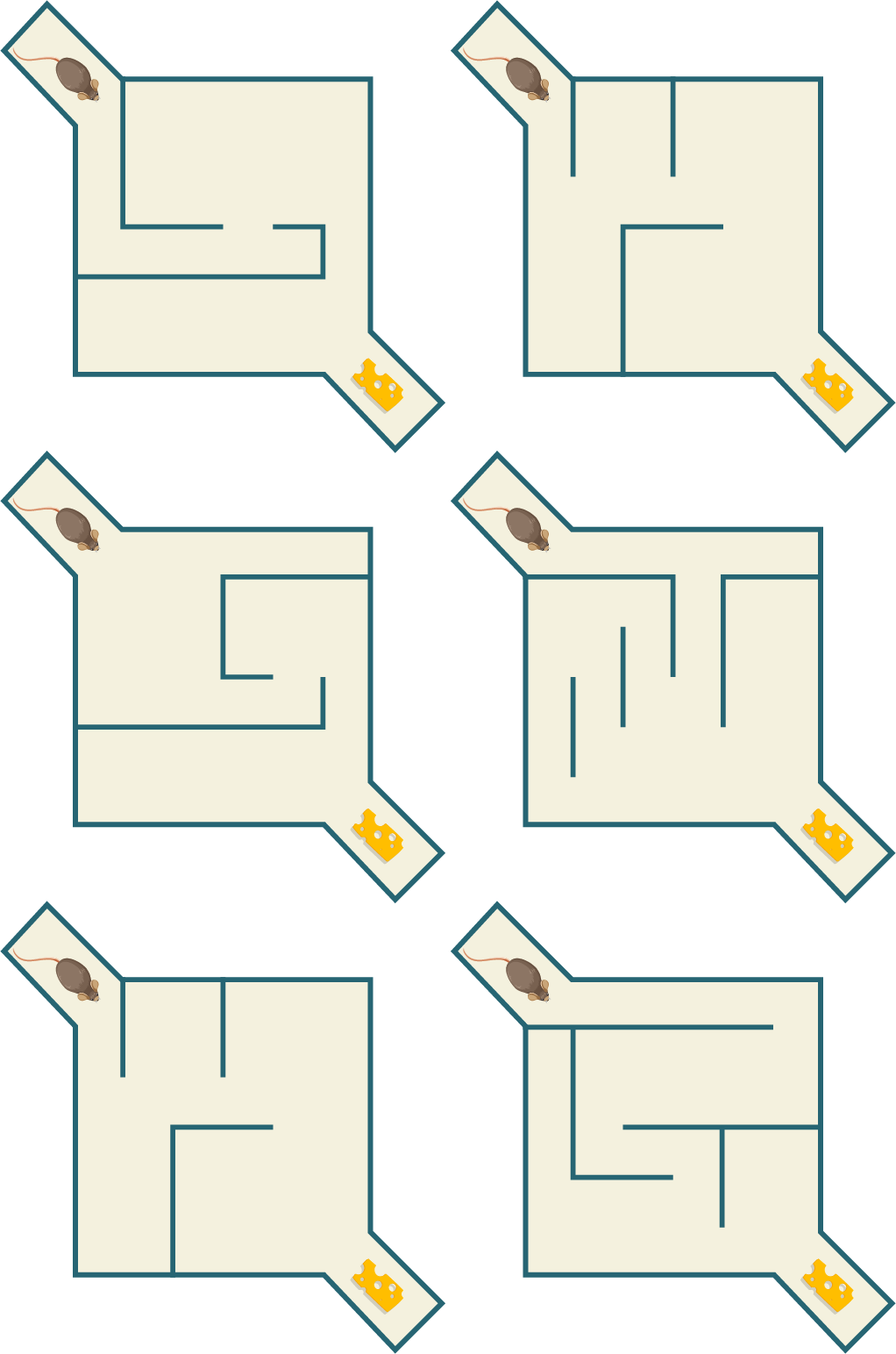
Top-down views of six different maze variations

The Hebb–Williams maze is a maze used in comparative psychology to assess the cognitive ability of small animals such as mice and rats. It was developed by Donald O. Hebb and his student Kenneth Williams in 1946, when both men were working at Queen's University at Kingston. A modified version, intended specifically to measure the intelligence of rats, was described in a 1951 paper by Hebb's students Rabinovitch and Rosvold. This modified version is the most commonly used in research where the aim is to measure animals' problem-solving abilities. In general, animals are tested in the Hebb–Williams maze's twelve separate mazes after acclimating to six practice mazes, though some studies have not used all twelve testing mazes. The two main procedures for the maze are the reward conditioning task and the water escape task. The maze has been used to investigate strain and sex differences in mice. A 2018 study argued that the maze is potentially useful for translational research in fragile X syndrome in humans.
