= Four Fs (evolution) =

Fighting, Fleeing, Feeding and Fucking

In evolutionary psychology, the four Fs refer to the four basic and most primal drives (motivations or instincts) that animals (including humans) are evolutionarily adapted to have, follow, and achieve: fighting, fleeing, feeding, fucking. Usually the profane word "fucking" is humorously implied but replaced with a politer synonym like "mating".

The list of the four activities appears to have been first introduced in the late 1950s and early 1960s in articles by psychologist Karl H. Pribram, with the fourth entry in the list being known by terms such as "sex" or occasionally "fornicating".

Conventionally, the four Fs were described as adaptations which helped the organism to find food, avoid danger, defend its territory, et cetera. However, in his book The Selfish Gene, Richard Dawkins argued that adaptive traits do not evolve to benefit individual organisms, but to benefit the passing on of genes.

== Four Fs and vertebrates ==
In the case of vertebrates, this list corresponds to the motivational behaviours that drive the activity in the hypothalamus, namely: fighting, fleeing, feeding and sexual functioning. The hypothalamus responds to these motivations by regulating activity in the endocrine system to release hormones to alter the behaviour of the animal. These hormones include epinephrine (adrenaline) to increase blood flow and heart rate for a sufficient fight-or-flight response, and ghrelin, which is commonly described as "the hunger hormone".

== In other animals ==
Species from other phyla than vertebrates, such as arthropods and sponges, do not possess a hypothalamus. Hormones that influence the behaviour of insects are excreted by neurosecretory cells (NCS) in the corpora cardiaca. Sponges, despite not having a neurosystem, do show signs of behaviour in response to external stimuli, but not much is known about neuro-sensory mechanisms in sponges and whether they possess all four of these drives.

== Related experiments ==
In order to explore the influences of the hypothalamus as a drive on the four Fs, researchers lesioned the lateral areas of the hypothalamus of rats. This resulted in a reduction in the interest of eating (feeding). If these animals were not fed or cared for, they starved to death, even when enough food was present around them. The influence of the hypothalamus is also clear when researchers overstimulated the hypothalamus. When the lateral areas of the hypothalamus were treated with electrical brain stimulation (EBS), the animals would start eating uncontrollably, which resulted in gaining excess weight rapidly.

The hypothalamus consists of clusters of highly similarly functioning nerve cells. These nerve cells operate so intimately that signals may get misinterpreted. Optogenetic stimulation of the ventromedial hypothalamus in male mice resulted in aggressive attacks towards male and female mice. When this area was controlled by silencing the ventromedial nucleus, mice showed increased interest in mating, showing a relationship between the responses to fighting and fornicating.

== See also ==
- Prey drive
