= Organization of Behavior =

1949 book by Donald O. Hebb

The Organization of Behavior
- Cover of the first edition
- Author: Donald O. Hebb
- Language: English
- Subject: Learning
- Published: 1949
- Media type: Print (hardcover and paperback)
- Pages: 378 (2002 Psychology Press edition)
- ISBN: 978-0805843002

Organization of Behavior is a 1949 book by the psychologist Donald O. Hebb. One of the main takeaways was that it proposed a theory about learning based on conjunctures on neural networks and synapses being able to strengthen or weaken over time.

== Reception ==
The author Richard Webster identifies Organization of Behavior as the most influential outline of Hebb's postulate. According to Webster, the hypothesis has classic status within science and is supported by recent research.
