= McGill Picture Anomaly Test =

- Purpose: assists in testing visual intelligence

The McGill Picture Anomaly Test (MPAT) is a scientific test that was created by Donald O. Hebb of McGill University and N.W. Morton that assists in testing visual intelligence as well as understanding human behavior. The test includes a series of pictures that each show a typical situation but have something out of place in the photo and provides evidence that supports the idea that the right temporal lobe is involved in visual recognition. When patients with lesions to the right temporal lobe were given the MPAT, they were unable to point to the absurdity in the photo and perceived that nothing was out of place. The test is used to measure a cultural comprehension which allows for a basis to then estimate an individual's intelligence. However, this test alone is not enough to accurately give a single score or representation of a person's overall intelligence. The MPAT is not meant to be used across a variety of populations due to the fact that the social norms of varied populations can be tremendously different, causing the results of the test to be indeterminate.

== Background ==
The McGill Picture Anomaly test was created in 1937 by Donald O. Hebb and N.W. Morton, a member of the McGill Psychology Department. Hebb applied for a job with Wilder Penfield, the founder of the Montreal Neurological Institute (MNI) where he, once hired, would study the psychological effects of brain operations. His research included observing the different cognitive impairments that resulted from brain lesions of various areas of the brain. He also conducted similar experiments in rats. After reviewing his observations, Hebb wanted to look for specific aspects of intelligence that were affected by a brain lesion. He wanted to look at these specific changes instead of attempting to measure an overall intellectual change. In Hebb's looking into specific aspects of intelligence affected by a brain lesion, he was led to the creation of both the verbal Comprehension Test as well as the non-verbal Picture Anomaly Test which he developed alongside N.W. Morton.

== Right Temporal Lobe ==
The temporal lobes are very important in the visual system as well as in the production and comprehension of language. The left temporal lobe contains Wernicke's area and Broca's area, which are both important in the production and comprehension of language. The right temporal lobe is a part of the ventral stream in the visual pathway. The ventral stream is involved in object perception and visual recognition such as faces and objects, and is therefore often referred to in relation to the McGill Picture Anomaly test. The ventral stream is often referred to as the "what" stream and provides a portrayal of the objects in the receptive field that ultimately aids in identifying the importance of the object. The different functions of each lobe account for the "disturbance of non-language capacities" experienced after the removal of the right temporal lobe. If the ventral stream is disturbed or altered, the subject will not lose his vision but the ability to recognize "what" the object is in his receptive field. Disturbances in the ventral stream can be caused by damage or deterioration to any part of the brain involved in the ventral stream including the right temporal lobe.

== Conducting the test ==
The McGill Picture Anomaly Test is a non-verbal test and requires the subject to simply point out the aspect of the photo or drawing that is out of place. When conducting the test, Hebb and Morton made it clear that the experimenter should use very little verbal instructions in order to eliminate the possibly of influencing the subject. Any remarks made by the participant during testing are ignored and do not contribute to the participant's overall score because the test is purely visual. Each series of the MPAT consists of 34 pictures each with an absurdity that is obvious to subjects with intact and normal functioning right temporal lobes but is more difficult for subjects with lesions or injuries of the right temporal lobe to recognize . An example of the pictures that may be included in the test is if the picture had a group of people dressed in nice evening wear but one person is wearing a hula girl outfit. In this picture, the absurdity would clearly be the hula girl. Donald O. Hebb and N.W. Norton combined the MPAT with the verbal situation series to create the McGill Adult Comprehension Examination which is used to measure adult intelligence.

Hebb and Norton intended for the MPAT to be used alone with the idea that it would aid in diagnostic tests; they also created the test with the intention that the test could be used for other experiments trying to measuring intelligence. The test is often used in experiments involving patients diagnosed with temporal lobe epilepsy because of the damage in their temporal lobe(s). It has also been shown in a study that the recognition of picture absurdities, such as those shown in the MPAT, was significantly lower in a group of patients with dementia of Alzheimer type. The dementia of Alzheimer type patients' results were compared to the results of patients with dementia syndrome of depression and cerebrovascular dementia. This impairment can be attributed to the reduced cognition and judgement utilizing visual data.

== Experiments ==
The McGill Picture Anomaly Test has been used in studies trying to measure intelligence and in studies trying to use it as a component of diagnosis. Experiments that used the MPAT for diagnostic value have shown no significant results that support any diagnostic value to the test. The potential diagnostic value of the MPAT would be in visual perception. The MPAT has been used in diagnosing patients with visual-constructive disabilities, and if they receive a normal score on the test, then they are not considered to have any difficulties with picture-interpretation tasks. An experiment conducted by William Sloan and Barbara Oblinger at Lincoln State School and Colony attempted to see if there were diagnostic values of Picture Anomaly tests and Verbal Absurdity tests in mental institution evaluations of patients. Sloan and Oblinger found that the Verbal Absurdity tests had some significant findings but there were no significant findings when using the MPAT. Sloan and Oblinger believe that the sample size may have affected the findings for the MPAT but have not conducted a follow up experiment testing that hypothesis.

Another experiment conducted by Denis Shalman attempted to see if the McGill Picture Anomaly Test has a diagnostic value with temporal lobe epilepsy. Shalman used patients with right temporal lobe epileptic episodes and patients with left temporal lobe epileptic episodes; Shalman hoped to replicate Brenda Milner's results which used the MPAT on patients with a temporal lobe lobectomy which found that certain dysfunctions in patients with disturbances of the right temporal lobe affected visual recognition. Milner found that when the right temporal lobe was removed from a patient, pictures and representational drawings became unclear and lost their distinctiveness to the patient. Shalman's findings did not support Milner's findings and showed that the McGill Picture Anomaly Test does not have the diagnostic value that Milner had previously claimed. Although the McGill Picture Anomaly Test has had little diagnostic value, the test is still a common test that experimenters use to determine if there are any problems with visual recognition and interpretation or the right temporal lobe.
