= Mortimer Mishkin =

American neuropsychologist (1926–2021)

Mortimer Mishkin (December 13, 1926 – October 2, 2021) was an American neuropsychologist, and winner of the 2009 National Medal of Science awarded in Behavior and Social Science.

== Life and career ==
Born in Fitchburg, Massachusetts in December 1926, Mishkin graduated from Dartmouth College in 1946, and took a 1949 M.A. and 1951 Ph.D. from McGill University under Donald O. Hebb. His Ph.D. thesis was partly directed by surgeon and theorist Karl H. Pribram.

In 2010 Mishkin won the National Medal of Science for his five decades of work on the mechanisms of cognition and memory, and the discovery that the brain processes memories in two separate processes: cognitive memory dealing with events and fresh information, and behavioral memory related to skills and habits.

As of 2016 Mishkin was Chief of the Section on Cognitive Neuroscience, Laboratory of Neuropsychology, National Institute of Mental Health, chartered to explore neurobiological mechanisms of perception and memory. He is also recognised for his role in establishing the two streams hypothesis on the organisation of extrastriate visual cortex (with Leslie Ungerleider).

Mishkin died in October 2021, at the age of 94.

== Awards ==
- APA Award for Distinguished Scientific Contributions to Psychology, 1985
- William James Fellow Award, awarded by the Association for Psychological Science, 1989
- Ariëns Kappers Medal, 1989
- Karl Spencer Lashley Award, for "pioneering analysis of the memory and the perceptual systems of the brain, and his seminal contributions to the understanding of the higher nervous system function", 1996
- Metlife Foundation Award for Medical Research in Alzheimer's Disease, 1999
- National Medal of Science, 2010
- Grawemeyer Award given by the University of Louisville, 2012
- NAS Award in the Neurosciences, 2016
