= Mass action principle (neuroscience) =

In neuroscience, the mass action principle suggests that the proportion of the brain that is injured is directly proportional to the decreased ability of memory functions. In other words, memory cannot be localized to a single cortical area, but is instead distributed throughout the cortex. This theory is contrasted by functional specialization. This is one of two principles that Karl Lashley published in 1950 alongside the equipotentiality principle.

== Early theories ==
In the 19th century, animal researchers and scientists were divided into two main groups in terms of how they believe the brain compensated for induced brain damage. The redundancy theorists hypothesized that any lesioned section of cerebral mass had an almost duplicate section, usually on the opposing hemisphere. This "back-up" area was considered to be what takes over the functions of the lesioned area. On the other hand, vicariation theorists believed that different areas of the brain with different functions could assume responsibility for the affected area. Both ideas were highly debated and led to increased research on neuroplasticity and lesion research, eventually affecting the lesion research of Flourens and Lashley.

== Contributors ==
Localization theories can be dated as far back as Aristotle, but the man credited with the beginning concepts of field theory was Jean Pierre Flourens. Field theory is the concept that the brain acts as a single functional unit. He devised the first principle of mass action, stating,

As long as not too much of the lobes is removed, they may in due time regain the exercise of their functions. Passing certain limits, however, the animal regains them only imperfectly, and passing these new limits it does not regain them at all. Finally, if one sensation comes back, all come back. If one faculty reappears, they all reappear ... This shows that each of these organs is only a single organ.

He also developed the theory of equipotentiality, stating, "All sensations, all perceptions, and all volition occupy concurrently the same seat in these organs. The faculty of sensation, perception, and volition is then essentially one faculty."

Karl Lashley's most famous research was an attempt to find the parts of the brain that were responsible for learning and memory traces, a hypothetical structure he called the engram. He trained rats to perform specific tasks (seeking a food reward), then lesioned varying portions of the rats' cortexes, either before or after the animals received the training depending upon the experiment. The amount of cortical tissue removed had specific effects on acquisition and retention of knowledge, but the location of the removed cortex had no effect on the rats' performance in the maze. This led Lashley to conclude that memories are not localized but widely distributed across the cortex.

Walter Jackson Freeman III, American neurophysiologist wrote extensively on the principle of mass action in neurodynamics. Freeman underlinded the low probability of a single spike of one neuron making another neuron responding. Instead, there is mass action of multiple potentials via multiple dendrites on a single axon or neuron that makes or doesn't make the neuron to respond.

Similar idea was also discussed and illustrated by the Australian neuroscientist John Morgan Allman.

== Versus functional specialization ==
There is evidence supporting both the mass action principle and functional specialization within the brain. Functional specialization is the idea that functions are localized within the brain and can only be carried out by particular area(s) of the brain. Some tasks appear to work on the mass action principle, with lesions causing less drastic effects than would be expected if the tasks were localized within the brain. This was shown in Lashley's rat maze experiments, in which the amount of tissue removed was more important to the rat's performance than where the tissue was removed from within the brain. There are, however, examples of highly specialized areas of the brain in which even small amounts of damage can cause dramatic effects on people's abilities to perform certain tasks. Two such areas effect the comprehension of speech and the ability to produce coherent speech, Wernicke's area and Broca's area, respectively.

== Criticisms ==
It is now believed that Flourens may have removed more than just the parts of the hemispheres that he claimed because his experiments can be replicated without his same drastic results. At the time, extraction methods were very crude and little was understood about the stages of recovery. These things contributed to the increased likelihood of symptoms occurring right after extraction to be attributed directly to the site of the lesion. Flourens' doctrine was widely accepted even though there were anatomists and physiologists disproving his ideas:

- Thomas Willis showed that there are nerves that connect the heart, lungs, and stomach to the cerebellum.
- François Pourfour du Petit demonstrated that localization of motor movements on one side of the body was contained in the hemisphere on the opposite side. In the 1860s, Hughlings Jackson also came to these conclusions after connecting convulsions on one side of the body to the disease of the opposite side of the brain.
- Alexander Bain explained the nervous system as a sort of interconnected system with the brain that transmits impulses.
- New experiments on electrical excitability in 1870 from Gustav Theodor Fritsch, Eduard Hitzig, and David Ferrier contributed to new findings regarding localization of function. And although their methods were still producing results that are considered off the mark today, they were important in building a foundation of support for a localization theory.
- Then Lashley came along with his publication of Brain Mechanisms and Intelligence in 1929. His findings were under the umbrella of field theory, but he didn't completely agree with Flourens. He determined that only the more elementary functions are localized, with the more complex ones not being bound to certain structures. Shepherd Ivory Franz contributed to this field greatly by using better methods to study live animals. Lashley used these methods in combination with a large sample of animals to get results that can be statistically analyzed, and therefore came up with his equipotentiality and mass action theories. However, many others came up with different conclusions based on his results that again cast doubt upon Lashley's determinations of what was observed.

== Conclusion ==
Currently mass action principle is accepted as a mechanism for some functions within the brain. However, there have been some functions that are believed to be contained within specific areas of the brain (many related to speech, which was impossible to determine when the mass action principle was theorized, as experiments historically only used animals). It does not appear that this difference is determined by difficulty of the function, as some highly specialized tasks are localized.
