= The Delicate Dependency =

1982 novel by Michael Talbot

- Author: Michael Talbot
- Language: English
- Genre: Horror
- Publisher: Avon Books
- Publication date: March 28, 1982
- Publication place: United States
- Media type: Print (paperback)
- Pages: 406
- ISBN: 978-0-380-77982-6

The Delicate Dependency: A Novel of the Vampire Life is a 1982 vampire novel by Michael Talbot.

== Plot ==
In Victorian London, widowed Dr. John Gladstone runs over a beautiful young man named Niccolo Cavalanti with his carriage. When others at the hospital begin to notice the injured man's unnatural healing ability, Gladstone shelters a recovering Niccolo in his home, and soon learns that the kind man is a vampire. Niccolo befriends both of Gladstone's daughters, the coming of age Ursula and the blind toddler Camille, and then disappears with Camille. Accompanied by Lady Hespeth Dunaway, a woman whose son was also abducted by Niccolo, Gladstone sets off to find his daughter.

== Publication ==
The Delicate Dependency was published by Avon Books on March 28, 1982, and eventually went out of print. It was republished by Valancourt Books in 2014.

== Reception ==
In Encyclopedia of the Vampire, Darrell Schweitzer called the novel "one of the most impressive explorations of a vampire mind ever written". Publishers Weekly called The Delicate Dependency "ambitious, "impressive", and "unflaggingly interesting.” Whitley Strieber noted of the novel, "The tension builds page by page to a stunning climax ... I doubt that I will ever forget it.” Fangoria named The Delicate Dependency as one of its "Top 10 Vampire Novels" in 1992.
