= Donald O. Hebb =

Canadian neuropsychologist (1904–1985)

Donald Olding Hebb
- Born: July 22, 1904; Chester, Nova Scotia, Canada
- Died: August 20, 1985 (aged 81); Chester, Nova Scotia, Canada
- Education: Dalhousie University (BA, 1925), McGill University (MA, 1932), Harvard University (PhD, 1936)
- Known for: Cell assembly theory
- Awards: Fellow of the Royal Society
- Scientific career
- Fields: Psychology
- Workplaces: Montreal Neurological Institute, Queen's University, Yerkes Laboratories of Primate Biology, McGill University
- Thesis: The innate organization of visual perception in the rat (1936)
- Doctoral advisor: Karl Spencer Lashley
- Doctoral students: Brenda Milner

Donald Olding Hebb FRS (July 22, 1904 – August 20, 1985) was a Canadian psychologist who was influential in the area of neuropsychology, where he sought to understand how the function of neurons contributed to psychological processes such as learning. He is best known for his theory of Hebbian learning, which he introduced in his classic 1949 work The Organization of Behavior. He has been described as the father of neuropsychology and neural networks. A Review of General Psychology survey, published in 2002, ranked Hebb as the 19th most cited psychologist of the 20th century. His views on learning described behavior and thought in terms of brain function, explaining cognitive processes in terms of connections between neuron assemblies.

== Early life ==
Donald Hebb was born in Chester, Nova Scotia, the oldest of four children of Arthur M. and M. Clara (Olding) Hebb, and lived there until the age of 16, when his parents moved to Dartmouth, Nova Scotia.

Hebb's parents were both medical doctors. Donald's mother was heavily influenced by the ideas of Maria Montessori, and she home-schooled him until the age of 8. He performed so well in elementary school that he was promoted to the 7th grade at 10 years of age but, as a result of failing and then repeating the 11th grade in Chester, he graduated from the 12th grade at 16 years of age from Halifax County Academy. (Many or most of the single class of grade 9, 10 and 11 students at the Chester school failed the provincial examinations. Those in 9th and 10th grades were permitted to advance despite their failure but there was no 12th grade in Chester.) He entered Dalhousie University aiming to become a novelist. He graduated with a Bachelor of Arts degree in 1925. Afterward, he became a teacher, teaching at his old school in Chester. Later, he worked on a farm in Alberta and then traveled around, working as a laborer in Quebec.

== Career ==
In 1928, he became a graduate student at McGill University. But, at the same time, he was appointed headmaster of Verdun High School in the suburbs of Montreal. He worked with two colleagues from the university, Kellogg and Clarke, to improve the situation. He took a more innovative approach to education—for example, assigning more interesting schoolwork and sending anyone misbehaving outside (making schoolwork a privilege). He completed his master's degree in psychology at McGill in 1932 under the direction of the eminent psychologist Boris Babkin. Hebb's master's thesis, entitled Conditioned and Unconditioned Reflexes and Inhibition, tried to show that skeletal reflexes were due to cellular learning.

By the beginning of 1934, Hebb's life was in a slump. His wife had died, following a car accident, on his twenty-ninth birthday (July 22, 1933). His work at the Montreal school was going badly. In his words, it was "defeated by the rigidity of the curriculum in Quebec's protestant schools." The focus of study at McGill was more in the direction of education and intelligence, and Hebb was now more interested in physiological psychology and was critical of the methodology of the experiments there.

He decided to leave Montreal and wrote to Robert Yerkes at Yale, where he was offered a position to study for a PhD. Babkin, however, convinced Hebb to study instead with Karl Lashley at the University of Chicago.

In July 1934, Hebb was accepted to study under Karl Lashley at the University of Chicago. His thesis was titled "The problem of spatial orientation and place learning". Hebb, along with two other students, followed Lashley to Harvard University in September 1935. Here, he had to change his thesis. At Harvard, he did his thesis research on the effects of early visual deprivation upon size and brightness perception in a rat. That is, he raised rats in the dark and some in the light and compared their brains. In 1936, he received his PhD from Harvard. The following year he worked as a research assistant to Lashley and as a teaching assistant in introductory psychology for Edwin G. Boring at Radcliffe College. His Harvard thesis was soon published, and he finished the thesis he started at University of Chicago.

In 1937, Hebb married his second wife, Elizabeth Nichols Donovan. That same year, on a tip from his sister Catherine (herself a PhD student with Babkin at McGill University), he applied to work with Wilder Penfield at the Montreal Neurological Institute. Here he researched the effect of brain surgery and injury on human brain function. He saw that the brain of a child could regain partial or full function when a portion of it is removed but that similar damage in an adult could be far more damaging, even catastrophic. From this, he deduced the prominent role that external stimulation played in the thought processes of adults. In fact, the lack of this stimulation, he showed, caused diminished function and sometimes hallucinations.

He also became critical of the Stanford-Binet and Wechsler intelligence tests for use with brain surgery patients. These tests were designed to measure overall intelligence, whereas Hebb believed tests should be designed to measure more specific effects that surgery could have had on the patient. Together with N.W. Morton, he created the Adult Comprehension Test and the Picture Anomaly Test.

Putting the Picture Anomaly Test to use, he provided the first indication that the right temporal lobe was involved in visual recognition. He also showed that removal of large parts of the frontal lobe had little effect on intelligence. In fact, in one adult patient, who had a large portion of his frontal lobes removed in order to treat his epilepsy, he noted "a striking post-operative improvement in personality and intellectual capacity." From these sorts of results, he started to believe that the frontal lobes were instrumental in learning only early in life.

In 1939, he was appointed to a teaching position at Queen's University. In order to test his theory of the changing role of the frontal lobes with age, he designed a variable path maze for rats with Kenneth Williams called the Hebb-Williams maze, a method for testing animal intelligence later used in countless studies. He used the maze to test the intelligence of rats blinded at different developmental stages, showing that "there is a lasting effect of infant experience on the problem-solving ability of the adult rat." This became one of the main principles of developmental psychology, later helping those arguing the importance of the proposed Head Start programs for preschool children in economically poor neighborhoods.

In 1942, he moved to Orange Park, Florida to once again work with Karl Lashley who had replaced Yerkes as the Director of the Yerkes Laboratories of Primate Biology at the Yerkes National Primate Research Center. Here, studying primate behavior, Hebb developed emotional tests for chimpanzees. The experiments were somewhat unsuccessful, however because chimpanzees turned out to be hard to teach. During the course of the work there, Hebb wrote The Organization of Behavior: A Neuropsychological Theory, his groundbreaking book that set forth the theory that the only way to explain behavior was in terms of brain function.

Afterward, he returned to McGill University to become a professor of psychology in 1947 and was made chairman of the department in 1948. Here he once again worked with Penfield, but this time through his students, which included Mortimer Mishkin, Haldor Enger Rosvold, and Brenda Milner, all of whom extended his earlier work with Penfield on the human brain.

His wife Elizabeth died in 1962. In 1966, Hebb married his third wife, Margaret Doreen Wright (née Williamson), a widow.

Hebb remained at McGill until retirement in 1972. He remained at McGill after retirement for a few years, in the Department of Psychology as an emeritus professor, conducting a seminar course required of all department graduate students.

In 1977 Hebb retired to his birthplace in Nova Scotia, where he completed his last book, Essay on Mind. He was appointed an honorary professor of psychology at his alma mater, Dalhousie, and regularly participated in colloquia there until his death at 81, in 1985. He was survived by two daughters (both by his second marriage), Mary Ellen Hebb and Jane Hebb Paul.

== Honors and awards ==
Hebb was a member of both the Canadian Psychological Association (CPA) and the American Psychological Association (APA). He was elected President of the CPA in 1953 and of the APA in 1960. He won the APA Distinguished Scientific Contribution Award in 1961.

He was elected a Fellow of the Royal Society of Canada and a Fellow of the Royal Society of London in March 1966.

He received an honorary doctorate from 15 universities, including in 1961 from University of Chicago, in 1965 from Dalhousie University and in 1975 from Concordia University.

The Donald O. Hebb Award, named in his honor, is awarded by the Canadian Psychological Association to distinguished Canadian psychologists. The award is presented yearly to a person who has made a significant contribution to promoting the discipline of psychology as a science by conducting research, by teaching and leadership, or as a spokesperson. The inaugural award was presented to Hebb in 1980.

In 2011, he was posthumously inducted into the Halifax, Nova Scotia, Discovery Centre's Hall of Fame. At a 2011 meeting of the executive council of the Committee for Skeptical Inquiry (CSI), Hebb was selected for inclusion in CSI's Pantheon of Skeptics, an award given to deceased fellows of CSI.

His archives, including records relating to research and teaching activities, are held by the McGill University Archives, McGill University, in Montreal.

== The Organization of Behavior (1949) ==
The Organization of Behavior is considered Hebb's most significant contribution to the field of neuroscience. A combination of his years of work in brain surgery mixed with his study of human behavior, it finally brought together the two realms of human perception that for a long time could not be connected properly, that is, it connected the biological function of the brain as an organ together with the higher function of the mind.

In 1929, Hans Berger discovered that the brain exhibits continuous electrical activity and cast doubt on the Pavlovian model of perception and response because, now, there appeared to be something going on in the brain even without much stimulus.

At the same time, there were many mysteries. For example, if there was a method for the brain to recognize a circle, how does it recognize circles of various sizes or imperfect roundness? To accommodate every single possible circle that could exist, the brain would need a far greater capacity than it has.

Another theory, the Gestalt theory, stated that signals to the brain established a sort of field. The form of this field depended only on the pattern of the inputs, but it still could not explain how this field was understood by the mind.

The behaviorist theories at the time did well at explaining how the processing of patterns happened. However, they could not account for how these patterns made it into the mind.

Hebb combined up-to-date data about behavior and the brain into a single theory. And, while the understanding of the anatomy of the brain did not advance much since the development of the older theories on the operation of the brain, he was still able to piece together a theory that got a lot of the important functions of the brain right.

Hebb's theory became known as Hebbian theory and the models which follow this theory are said to exhibit "Hebbian learning." He proposed a neurophysiological account of learning and memory based in a simple principle:

When an axon of cell A is near enough to excite cell B and repeatedly or persistently takes part in firing it, some growth process or metabolic change takes place in one or both cells such that A's efficiency, as one of the cells firing B, is increased.

This is often paraphrased as "Neurons that fire together wire together." It is commonly referred to as Hebb's Law.

The combination of neurons which could be grouped together as one processing unit, Hebb referred to as "cell-assemblies". And their combination of connections made up the ever-changing algorithm which dictated the brain's response to stimuli.

Not only did Hebb's model for the working of the mind influence how psychologists understood the processing of stimuli within the mind but also it opened up the way for the creation of computational machines that mimicked the biological processes of a living nervous system. And while the dominant form of synaptic transmission in the nervous system was later found to be chemical, modern artificial neural networks are still based on the transmission of signals via electrical impulses that Hebbian theory was first designed around.

== Theories of education ==
Hebb was instrumental in defining psychology as a biological science by identifying thought as the integrated activity of the brain. His views on learning described behavior and thought in terms of brain function, explaining cognitive processes in terms of connections between neuron assemblies. These ideas played a large part in his views on education and learning.

Hebb viewed motivation and learning as related properties. He believed that everything in the brain was interrelated and worked together. His theory was that everything we experience in our environment fires a set of neurons called a cell assembly. This cell assembly is the brain's thoughts or ideas. These cell assemblies then work together to form phase sequences, which are streams of thoughts. Once these cell assemblies and phase sequences are formed, they can be activated by stimulation from the environment. Therefore, the more stimulating and rich the environment, the more the cell assemblies grow and learn. This theory played into his beliefs in education. Hebb believed that the environment was very important to learning in children. Children learn by building up these cell assemblies and phase sequences. An enriched environment with varied opportunities for sensory and motor experiences contribute to children developing the cell assemblies and phase sequences necessary for continued learning in adulthood. To attempt to prove this, Hebb and his daughters raised pet rats at home. By raising them in an enriched environment, the rats showed improved maze learning in adulthood. This research into environmental enrichment contributed to the development of the Head Start Program used today.

Head Start is a program for preschool children in low-income families. The aim of the program is to prepare children for success in school through an early learning program providing cognitively stimulating educational activities. According to the findings in a study on Head Start participation and school readiness, full-time Head Start participation was associated with higher academic skills in children of less-educated parents.

Another long-term study by Hart and Risley tracked 42 children and their families over two years. The study focused on early language acquisition and the role of the home and family in the growth of word learning and language development. The results of their study showed that two of the most important aspects in language acquisition are the economic advantages of the children's homes and the frequency of language experiences. The study demonstrated that children of lower socioeconomic status homes, with fewer economic resources, learn fewer words and acquire vocabulary more slowly than children of professional parents with a higher socioeconomic status with access to more varied and enriched vocabulary experiences.

Hebb believed that providing an enriched environment for childhood learning would benefit adult learning as well, since a second type of learning occurs as adults. This second type of learning is a more rapid and insightful learning because the cell assemblies and phase sequences have already been created and now can be rearranged in any number of ways. The Hebbian theory of learning implies that every experience a person encounters becomes set into the network of brain cells. Then, each time a certain action or thought is repeated, the connection between neurons is strengthened, changing the brain and strengthening the learning. An individual is, in essence, training their brain. The more challenging new experiences a person has and practices, the more new connections are created in their brain.

=== Hebb as an educator ===
As a professor at McGill, he believed that one could not teach motivation, but rather create the conditions necessary for students under which to do their study and research. One could train them to write, help them choose a problem to study, and even help keep them from being distracted, but the motivation and passion for research and study had to come from the students themselves. He believed that students should be evaluated on their ability to think and create rather than their ability to memorize and reprocess older ideas.

Hebb believed in a very objective study of the human mind, more as a study of a biological science. This attitude toward psychology and the way it is taught made McGill University a prominent center of psychological study.

Hebb also came up with the A/S ratio, a value that measures the brain complexity of an organism.

=== Controversial research ===
Hebb's name has often been invoked in discussions of the involvement of psychological researchers in interrogation techniques, including the use of sensory deprivation, because of his research into this field. Speaking at a Harvard symposium on sensory deprivation in June 1958, Hebb is quoted as remarking:

The work that we have done at McGill University began, actually, with the problem of brainwashing. We were not permitted to say so in the first publishing.... The chief impetus, of course, was the dismay at the kind of "confessions" being produced at the Russian Communist trials. "Brainwashing" was a term that came a little later, applied to Chinese procedures. We did not know what the Russian procedures were, but it seemed that they were producing some peculiar changes of attitude. How?

One possible factor was perceptual isolation and we concentrated on that.

Hebb's isolation research followed a secret meeting on brainwashing at the Ritz-Carlton Hotel in Montreal on June 1, 1951, attended by defence and research officials from Canada, the United States and Britain, including two representatives of the CIA. Three months later he received a secret grant, designated X-38, from Canada's Defence Research Board. When news of the experiments leaked in early 1954, defence officials described them as a study of monotonous work, and the federal government ended funding for the research that year.

Recent research has argued that Hebb's sensory deprivation research was funded by and coordinated with the CIA (with the CIA intending to use the research to develop new interrogation and torture techniques). Some of this research was done in secret, and the results were initially shared only with United States authorities. Some of this research involved volunteers who spent hours in sensory deprivation conditions that some argue should be considered torture, although the subjects in his studies were university student volunteers, not patients, and were free to quit the experiment at any time.

== Notable students ==
- Michael C. Corballis
- Leo Goldberger
- Stevan Harnad
- Doreen Kimura
- Ronald Melzack
- Brenda Milner
- Mortimer Mishkin
- Lynn Nadel
- James Olds
- Michael Posner
- Case Vanderwolf

== Selected publications ==
- The Organization of Behaviour. 1949. John Wiley & Sons. ISBN 978-0-471-36727-7
- Essay on Mind. Hillsdale, New Jersey: Lawrence Erlbaum. 1980. ISBN 978-0-89859-017-3 – via Internet Archive..
- The Conceptual Nervous System. 1982. Pergamon Press. ISBN 008-027418-8: a collection of 21 papers by Hebb, with a complete list of his publications, edited by Henry A. Buchtel.
- A Textbook of Psychology. Philadelphia and London: W. B. Saunders and Co. 1958. ISBN 978-0-7872-1103-5 – via Internet Archive.
