= Walter Jackson Freeman III =

American biologist, theoretical neuroscientist and philosopher (1927–2016)

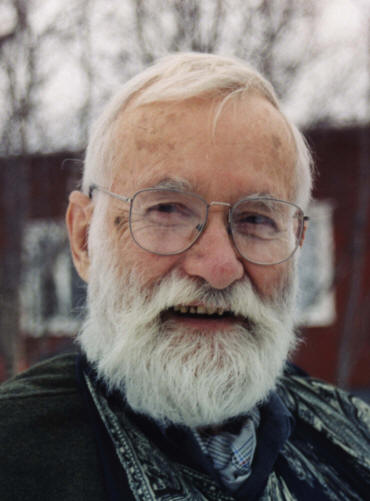
- Photo of Walter J. Freeman III c. 2007
- Born: January 30, 1927; Washington, D.C., U.S.
- Died: April 24, 2016 (aged 89); Berkeley, California, U.S.
- Education: Yale School of Medicine, Massachusetts Institute of Technology, The University of Chicago
- Parent(s): Walter Jackson Freeman II (father); William Williams Keen (great-grandfather)

Walter Jackson Freeman III (January 30, 1927 – April 24, 2016), was an American biologist, theoretical neuroscientist and philosopher who conducted research in rabbits' olfactory perception, using EEG. Based on a theoretical framework of neurodynamics that draws upon insights from chaos theory, he speculated that the currency of brains is primarily meaning, and only secondarily information.

In "Societies of Brains" and in other writings, Freeman rejected the view that the brain uses representations to enable knowledge and behavior.

== Biography ==
Walter Freeman was born in Washington, DC. He should not be confused with his father, Walter Jackson Freeman II, who infamously invented the ice pick version of the lobotomy. His great-grandfather was William Williams Keen.

Freeman died at his home in Berkeley, California on April 24, 2016 from pulmonary fibrosis, aged 89.

A special Theme Issue of the journal Nonlinear Dynamics in Psychology (N 21/4, 2017) was devoted to Freeman's work and theory.

== Contribution to science ==
Freeman was a multi-disciplinary scientist, prominent in both neuroscience and mathematics. He studied physics and mathematics at the Massachusetts Institute of Technology, electronics in the Navy in World War II, philosophy at the University of Chicago, medicine at Yale University, internal medicine at Johns Hopkins, and neuropsychiatry at University of California, Los Angeles. He received his M.D. cum laude in 1954.

He was a Professor Emeritus of Neurobiology at University of California, Berkeley. He was also the head of the international advisory council at the Bhaktivedanta Institute for advanced scientific research in consciousness. Freeman was also the President of the International Neural Network Society in 1994, a Life Fellow of the IEEE and a prominent member of the Society for Chaos Theory in Psychology and Life Sciences. He has authored over 450 articles and 4 books.

In 2008, Freeman proposed that Thomism is the philosophical system explaining cognition that is most compatible with neurodynamics.

Freeman is credited as a being founding father of the new discipline – neurodynamics. He experimentally analysed electrodynamics of the brain and described a development of chaotic attractors in neurodynamics as dispositions to attribute a specific set of meaning, with the final decision occurring after the encounter with the events.

Freeman underlined constructivism in behavioural and cognitive processes.

Freeman promoted the idea of "mass action" principle in neuronal transmission. He wrote extensively on the principle of mass action in brain activity and underlinded the low probability of a single spike of one neuron making another neuron responding. Instead, there is mass action of multiple potentials via multiple dendrites on a single axon or neuron that makes or doesn't make the neuron to respond.

Together with Robert Kozma, Freeman introduced the idea of cognitive phase, a generalization to dynamically systems of the concept of phase in physics, and with it a concept of cognitive phase transition, to explain the nature and progression of cognitive states in the brain.

== Awards ==
- Bennett Award from the Society of Biological Psychiatry in 1964
- Guggenheim Fellowship in 1965
- the MERIT Award from NIMH in 1990
- Pioneer Award from the Neural Networks Council of the IEEE in 1992.

== Bibliography ==
- Freeman, Walter. Mass Action in the Nervous System, Academic Press, 1975
- Freeman, Walter. Societies of Brains: A Neuroscience of Love and Hate, Taylor and Francis, 1995
- Freeman, Walter. How Brains Make up Their Minds, Columbia Uninversity Press, 1999
- Freeman, Walter. Neurodynamics: An Exploaration in Mesoscopic Brain Dynamics,Springer, 2000
- Freeman, Walter and Nunez, R. Reclaiming Cognition: The Primacy of Action, intention and Emotion. Imprint Academic, 2000
