= Alfred L. Yarbus =

Soviet psychologist

Alfred Lukyanovich Yarbus (Альфред Лукьянович Ярбус; 3 April 1914 in Moscow – 1986) was a Soviet psychologist who studied eye movements in the 1950s and 1960s.

Yarbus pioneered the study of saccadic exploration of complex images, by recording the eye movements performed by observers while viewing natural objects and scenes. In his 1965 book ("Eye Movements and Vision"), Yarbus showed that the trajectories followed by the gaze depend on the task that the observer has to perform. The gaze tends to jump back and forth between the same parts of the scene, for example, the eyes and mouth in the picture of a face. If the observer was asked specific questions about the images, his/her eyes would concentrate on areas of the images of relevance to the questions. Yarbus also invented a suction cup, which can be attached by suction to the human eye to study visual perceptions in the absence of eye movements, a laboratory condition called retinal stabilization.

== Books ==
A. L. Yarbus, Eye Movements and Vision. New York: Plenum Press, 1967. (Translated from Russian by Basil Haigh. Original Russian edition published in Moscow in 1965.)

== See also ==
- Sequence learning
- Psychology
- Psychophysics
- Eye tracking
- Saccade
