= Association cortex =

Part of the cerebral cortex

The association cortex is a part of the cerebral cortex that performs complex cognitive functions. Unlike primary sensory or motor areas, which process specific sensory inputs or motor outputs, the association cortex integrates information from various sources to support higher-order cognitive processes. This integration allows for complex functions such as perception, language, and thought. Therefore, species that possess large amounts of association cortex tend to show advanced reasoning skills.

The association cortex is generally divided into unimodal and heteromodal (or polymodal) areas, which process either a single sensory modality or multiple modalities, respectively.

== Types ==
- Unimodal association cortex: This area receives input from a single sensory modality. The output from the unimodal cortex is largely to unimodal areas. For example, the visual association cortex in the occipital lobe processes visual information, and the auditory association cortex in the temporal lobe processes auditory information.
- Heteromodal (polymodal) association cortex: This area integrates information from multiple sensory modalities. It plays a critical role in higher cognitive functions, including attention, memory, language, and conscious thought. Heteromodal association cortex is hypothesised to be selectively involved in the neuropathology of schizophrenia.

== Examples in humans ==
- Anterior association area: Located in the prefrontal cortex. This area is important in memory and planning.
- Posterior association area: Located in the posterior parietal lobe. This area plays an important role in perception and language. Damage to this area can result in agnosia.
- Limbic association area: Located in the anterior-ventral portion of the temporal lobe, this area links emotion with sensory inputs.
