= Shepherd Ivory Franz =

American psychologist

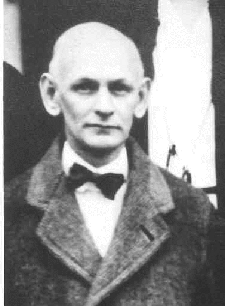
Shepherd Ivory Franz (1920)

Shepherd Ivory Franz (May 27, 1874 – October 14, 1933) was an American psychologist. He was the first chairman of the psychology department at the University of California, Los Angeles and served as president of the American Psychological Association. Franz was the editor of multiple psychological journals and he contributed research to the concepts of neuroplasticity, afterimages and cerebral localization. He spent many years affiliated with George Washington University School of Medicine & Health Sciences and the Government Hospital for the Insane, later known as St. Elizabeth's Hospital.

== Biography ==
=== Early life ===
Shepherd Franz was born on May 27, 1874, in Jersey City, New Jersey, where Franz attended public schools. His father was a German immigrant. Franz earned an undergraduate degree and a PhD in psychology from Columbia University. Franz attended graduate school with Edward Thorndike and studied under James McKeen Cattell. He studied in Leipzig in Germany for one year but seldom encountered Wilhelm Wundt while he was there.

=== Career ===
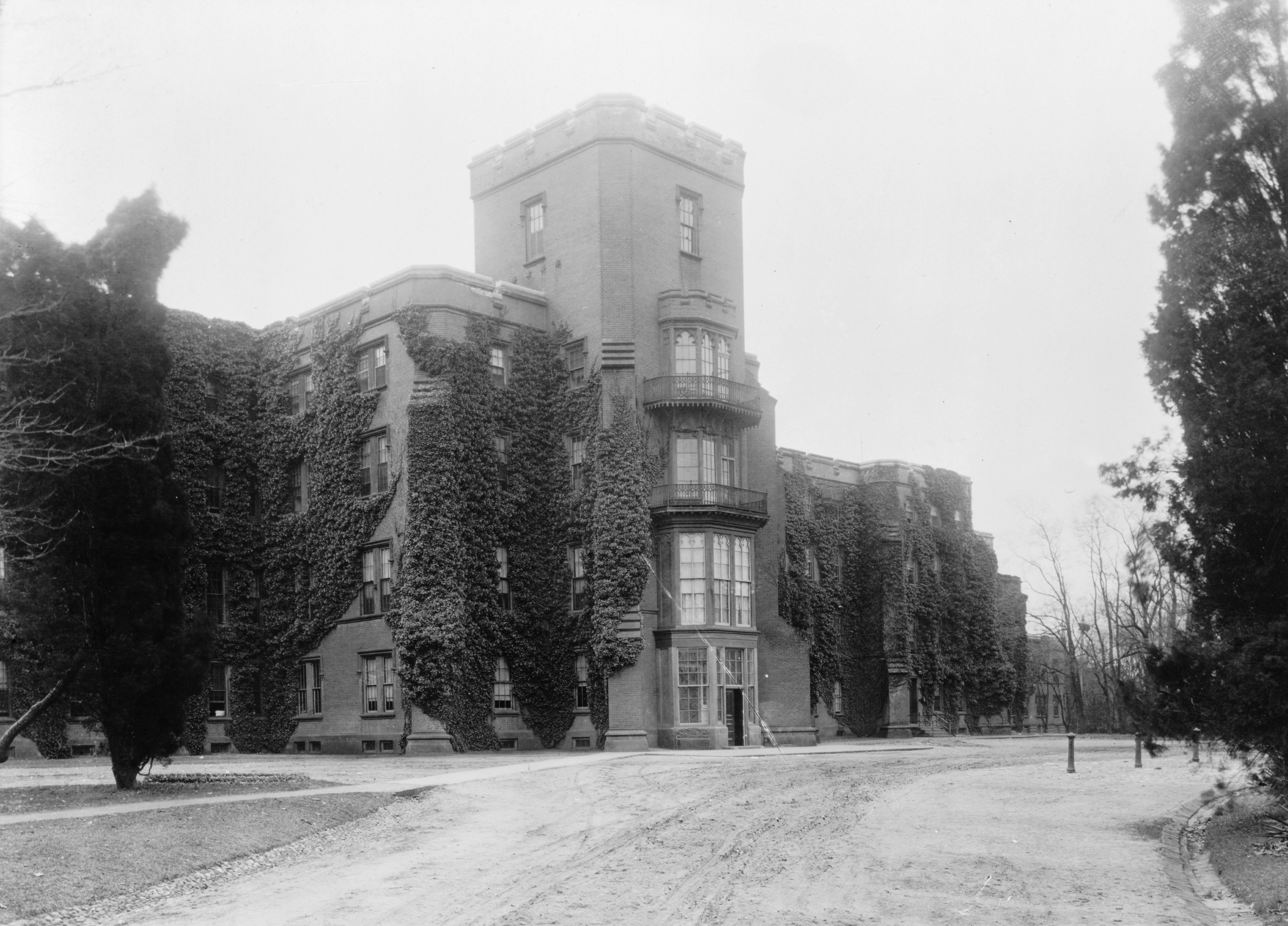
Government Hospital for the Insane (St. Elizabeth's Hospital), early 20th century.

After graduate school, Franz joined Harvard University as an assistant in physiology. He worked with Henry Pickering Bowditch and W. T. Porter on the feasibility of re-education in cats; Franz removed certain learned skills from cats through ablative brain surgery, then he retaught the skills to the cats. From 1901 to 1904, Franz taught psychology at Dartmouth College, then worked in psychological pathology at McLean Hospital until 1906.

Franz was then a physiology professor at George Washington University School of Medicine & Health Sciences and a psychologist at the Government Hospital for the Insane. He served as the scientific director at the hospital until 1919, then as its research director. Beginning in 1922, Franz coordinated a comprehensive six-month course in neuropsychiatry for physicians in the Veterans Bureau. By 1924, the hospital had shifted to a more psychoanalytic focus and Franz's salary and title were reduced after an employee in one of the laboratories left a door unlocked and a Bunsen burner ignited. Franz quickly resigned after the demotion.

After leaving the hospital, Franz moved to California to teach at the University of California, Los Angeles (UCLA). While there, he was named a professor of psychology the following year and remained on the faculty until his death.

=== Contributions ===
Franz was interested in brain plasticity, which he called, among other names, "functional substitution." He interpreted a study by Karplus involving the corpus callosum and epilepsy as supporting the activation of a secondary pathway, stating, “If one pathway be blocked there is the possibility of using one or more normally little used routes,” and that the nonlesioned brain areas can take over the function.

Another one of Franz’ interests was the localization of brain function. In 1902, Franz conducted a number of experiments on cats to figure out the relation of cerebrum's frontal lobes to the production and retention of simple sensorimotor habits. After a bilateral lesion of the frontal lobes, particular habits that Franz had created in the animals were lost. Unilateral lesions caused a slower motor response. These studies were similar to the ones he did with monkeys (cite).

Franz was interested in the role of the frontal lobes in the re-learning of learned behaviors (1906). In one study, he sectioned the frontal lobes of seven macaque and two ringtail monkeys. He used two tasks: one requiring a specific operant response which was to turn a button 90 degrees for the animal to receive the food. (cite) The other task was a chain of behaviors that Franz called the “Hurdle experiments” in which a monkey gets around and through obstacles to make their way to three boxes, the middle of which contains food that the monkey obtains after lifting the lid. (cite) After the animal had learned these two behaviors enough to demonstrate them quickly after not practicing for a week, their frontal lobes were removed and the experiment was repeated after surgery recovery. Similarly to what he found when working with cats, Franz found that the destruction of the frontal lobes caused the animals to lose habits, but they could acquire the same response again or new associations. With associations that were firmly established in the animal's brain by overlearning, the loss of the frontal lobes did not always cause the loss of these associations or habits. With this study, Frans suggested that the sensory and motor elements of the associations happen in certain areas of the brain stem, which means the associations are more reflexive than learned. He also suggested that after the loss of the frontal lobe function, the basal ganglia adjusted to the loss and took over. (cite) In rat experiments conducted alongside Karl Lashley, Franz found that rats that were either trained or overtrained in a food maze and had their frontal lobes destroyed did not lose their ability to re-learn the habit.

=== Honors and achievements ===
Franz served as the fifth president of the Southern Society for Philosophy and Psychology in 1912. He became a Fellow of the American Medico-Psychological Association, a rare distinction for a non-physician at the time. He was also a Fellow of the American Association for the Advancement of Science. Franz received an honorary medical degree from George Washington University and an honorary doctor of laws from Waynesburg College in 1915, and he was a recipient of Columbia University's Butler Medal in 1924. He served as president of the American Psychological Association in 1920 and as president of the Western Psychological Association several years later. Franz served stints as editor of Psychological Bulletin, Psychological Monographs and Journal of General Psychology.

=== Death and legacy ===
Franz died in Los Angeles on October 14, 1933. His sudden death came only a few months after being diagnosed with amyotrophic lateral sclerosis, later known as Lou Gehrig's disease.

The psychology department at the University of California, Los Angeles is housed in Franz Hall. The university issues a teaching assistant award in his name.

== Selected works ==
=== Books ===
- Localization of Brain Function (1901)
- Handbook of Mental Examination Methods (1919)
- Nervous and Mental Re-Education (1923)
- Persons One and Three: A Study in Multiple Personalities (1933)
