= Karl Lashley =

American psychologist (1890-1958)

Karl Spencer Lashley
- Born: June 7, 1890; Davis, West Virginia, US
- Died: August 7, 1958 (aged 68); Poitiers, France
- Education: Johns Hopkins University
- Known for: Learning and memory
- Awards: Foreign Member of the Royal Society (1951); Daniel Giraud Elliot Medal (1943)
- Scientific career
- Fields: Psychology
- Workplaces: University of Minnesota, University of Chicago, Harvard University
- Doctoral advisor: Herbert S. Jennings

Karl Spencer Lashley (June 7, 1890 – August 7, 1958) was an American psychologist and behaviorist remembered for his contributions to the study of learning and memory. A Review of General Psychology survey, published in 2002, ranked Lashley as the 61st most cited psychologist of the 20th century.

== Early life and education ==
Lashley was born on June 7, 1890, in the town of Davis, West Virginia. He was the only child of Charles and Maggie Lashley. He grew up in a middle-class family with a reasonably comfortable life. Lashley's father held various local political positions. His mother was a stay-at-home parent, and had a vast collection of books in the home. She brought in women from the community, whom she would teach various subjects. This is no doubt what gave Lashley his love of learning. Lashley has always held his family in high regard. He has said that his father was a kind man.

Lashley's mother was a strong advocate of schooling, and she encouraged Lashley intellectually from an early age. Lashley was a very active boy, both physically and mentally. He was able to read by the age of four. His favorite thing to do as a child was to wander through the woods and collect animals, like butterflies and mice. He spent most of his childhood alone. Lashley did not have many friends. The reasons for his lack of friendships is unclear. Lashley graduated high school at age 14.

Lashley enrolled at West Virginia University, where he had originally intended to become an English major. He took a course in zoology, however, and switched his major to zoology due to his interactions with the professor John Black Johnston. Lashley wrote, "Within a few weeks in his class I knew that I had found my life's work".

After obtaining his Bachelor of Arts at West Virginia University, Lashley was awarded a teaching fellowship at the University of Pittsburgh, where he taught biology along with biological laboratories. While there he also carried out research which he used for his master's thesis. Once Lashley completed his master's degree, he studied at Johns Hopkins University, where he received his PhD in genetics in June 1911. He became a professor at University of Minnesota, University of Chicago, and Harvard University.

At Hopkins, Lashley minored in psychology under John B. Watson, whom he continued to work closely with him after receiving his PhD. It was during this time that Lashley worked with Shepherd Ivory Franz and was introduced to his training/ablation method. Watson had a great deal of influence on Lashley. Together the two conducted field experiments and studied the effects of different drugs on maze learning of rats. Watson helped Lashley to focus on specific problems in learning and experimental investigation, followed by locating the area of the cerebrum involved in learning and discrimination.

== Career ==
Lashley's career began with research concerning brain mechanisms and how they were related to sense receptors. He also conducted work on instinct as well as color vision. He studied many animals and primates, which had been an interest since his freshman year at college.

Lashley worked at the University of Minnesota from 1917 to 1926 and then at the Institute for Juvenile Research in Chicago before becoming a professor at the University of Chicago. After this he went to Harvard, but was dissatisfied and from there became the director of the Yerkes Laboratory of Primate Biology in Orange Park, Florida.

Lashley's most influential research centered around the cortical basis of learning and discrimination. He researched this by looking at the measurement of behavior before and after specific, carefully quantified, induced brain damage in rats. Lashley trained rats to perform specific tasks (seeking a food reward), then lesioned specific areas of the rats' cortex, either before or after the animals received the training. The cortical lesions had specific effects on acquisition and retention of knowledge, but the location of the removed cortex had no effect on the rats' performance in the maze. This led Lashley to conclude that memories are not localized, but that they are widely distributed across the cortex. Today we know that distribution of engrams does in fact exist, but that the distribution is not equal across all cortical areas, as Lashley assumed. His study of V1 (primary visual cortex) led him to believe that it was a site of learning and memory storage (i.e. an engram) in the brain. He reached this erroneous conclusion due to imperfect lesioning methods.

By the 1950s, two separate principles had grown out of Lashley's research: mass action and equipotentiality. "Mass action" refers to the idea that the rate, efficacy and accuracy of learning depend on the amount of cortex available. If cortical tissue is destroyed following the learning of a complex task, deterioration of performance on the task is determined more by the amount of tissue destroyed than by its location. "Equipotentiality" refers to the idea that one part of the cortex can take over the function of another part; within a functional area of the brain, any tissue within that area can perform its associated function. Therefore, to destroy a function, all the tissue within a functional area must be destroyed. If the area is not destroyed then the cortex can take over another part. These two principles grew out of Lashley's research on the cortical basis of learning and discrimination.

== Later life ==
In February 1954, while doing his teaching at Harvard, Lashley unexpectedly collapsed and was hospitalized. He was diagnosed with hemolytic anemia and put on a cortisone treatment. This eventually began to soften his vertebrae, and as a result a splenectomy was performed. Lashley was on the road to a full recovery until his trip to France with his wife Clair, where he once again unexpectedly collapsed, but this time to his death on August 7, 1958.

== Honors ==
Lashley was elected to many scientific and philosophical societies, including the American Psychological Association (Council member 1926–1928; President, 1929), Eastern Psychological Association (President, 1937), Society of Experimental Psychologists, British Psychological Association (Honorary Fellow), American Society of Zoologists, American Society of Naturalists (President, 1947), British Institute for the Study of Animal Behavior (Honorary Member), American Society of Human Genetics, American Physiological Society, Harvey Society (Honorary Member), National Academy of Sciences (elected in 1930). In 1938, Lashley was elected a Member of the American Philosophical Society, the oldest learned society in the United States, dating to 1743. Since 1957, the Society has awarded the annual Karl Spencer Lashley Award in recognition of work on the integrative neuroscience of behavior. In 1943, Lashley was awarded the Daniel Giraud Elliot Medal from the National Academy of Sciences.

Lashley was awarded honorary Doctor of Science degrees from the University of Pittsburgh (1936), the University of Chicago (1941), Western Reserve University (1951), the University of Pennsylvania; in 1953, Johns Hopkins University presented him with an honorary Doctor of Laws degree.

== Criticisms ==
Lashley had a reputation as an objective scientist, but Nadine Weidman has tried to expose him as racist and a genetic determinist. However, Donald Dewsbury and others have disputed the claim that he was a genetic determinist, citing research of Lashley's in which he found evidence of both genetic and environmental influences on organisms. Dewsbury does admit, however, that Lashley was quite racist. He cites a line from a letter that Lashley wrote to a German colleague which reads: "Too bad that the beautiful tropical countries are all populated by negros. Heil Hitler and Apartheit!" This line alone would leave little debate on this matter, but he cites others as well.

== Notable publications ==
- 1923 "The behavioristic interpretation of consciousness." Psychological Review
- 1929 "Brain mechanisms and intelligence."
- 1930 "Basic neural mechanisms in behavior." Psychological Review
- 1932 "Studies in the dynamics of behavior." University of Chicago Press.
- 1935 "The mechanism of vision", Part 12: Nervous structures concerned in the acquisition and retention of habits based on reactions to light. Comparative Psychology Monographs 11: 43–79.
- 1943 "Studies of Cerebral Function in Learning", Journal of Comparative Neurology vol. 79.
- 1950 "In search of the engram." Society of Experimental Biology Symposium 4: 454–482.
- 1951 "The problem of serial order in behavior." Cerebral Mechanisms in Behavior.

== See also ==
- Sequence learning
