= List of things named after Roger Penrose =

This is a list of things named for the British scientist Roger Penrose:

== Mathematics ==
- Moore–Penrose inverse, the most widely known generalization of the inverse matrix in particular linear algebra
- Penrose graphical notation, a visual depiction of multilinear functions or tensors
- Penrose stairs, impossible object (co-created with his father Lionel Penrose)
- Penrose tiling, an example of an aperiodic tiling
- Penrose triangle, impossible object (co-created with his father Lionel Penrose)
- Penrose unilluminable room, first solution to the illumination problem

== Physics ==
- Diósi–Penrose model, possible solution to the measurement problem
- Geroch–Held–Penrose formalism
- Newman–Penrose formalism, a set of notation for general relativity
- Penrose diagram, a two-dimensional diagram capturing the causal relations between different points in spacetime
- Penrose inequality, estimation of the mass of a spacetime
  - Penrose conjecture
- Penrose interpretation, speculation about the relationship between quantum mechanics and general relativity
- Penrose process, or Penrose mechanism, a theoretical means whereby energy can be extracted from a rotating black hole
- Penrose singularity theorem in general relativity
- Penrose transform, a complex analogue of the Radon transform in theoretical physics
- Penrose–Terrell effect, visual distortion according to the special theory of relativity
- Penrose–Ward correspondence
- Rietdijk–Putnam–Penrose argument, version of Rietdijk–Putnam argument

== Other ==
- Penrose–Lucas argument, a logical argument
- Penrose tennis ball, 1995, a novel economical design in which the two halves that cup to form the ball very nearly tile the plane.
