= Vahe Gurzadyan =

Armenian physicist (born 1955)

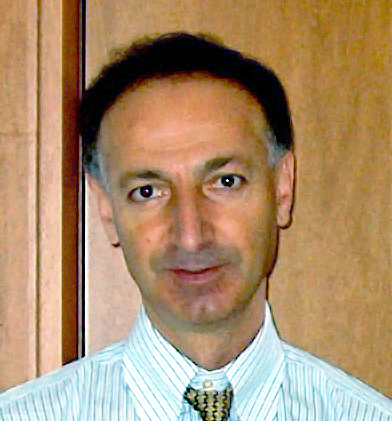
- Born: 21 November 1955 (age 70); Yerevan, Armenian SSR, Soviet Union
- Education: Yerevan State University; Lebedev Physics Institute (PhD)
- Known for: Information panspermia Gurzadyan–Savvidy relaxation Gurzadyan theorem
- Scientific career
- Fields: Mathematical physics
- Workplaces: Yerevan Physics Institute

Vahagn "Vahe" Gurzadyan (Armenian: Վահագն Գուրզադյան; born 21 November 1955) is an Armenian mathematical physicist and a professor and head of Cosmology Center at Yerevan Physics Institute, Yerevan, Armenia, best known for co-writing "Concentric circles in WMAP data may provide evidence of violent pre-Big-Bang activity" paper with his colleague, Roger Penrose, and collaborating on Roger Penrose's recent book Cycles of Time.

Gurzadyan was born in Yerevan, Armenian SSR. He graduated from Yerevan State University (1977), was a postgraduate student in the theoretical physics department of the Lebedev Physics Institute at Moscow (1977–1980; 1980 PhD.), DSci in theoretical and mathematical physics (1988).

In 1989 he lectured on dynamical systems in four universities in Japan (Tokyo, Kyoto, Hiroshima, Fukui), and subsequently held visiting positions at the University of Sussex (1996–1997) and, since 2001, at Sapienza University of Rome. His father Grigor Gurzadyan, an Armenian astronomer, pioneered space-based astronomy using satellites. His grandfather Ashkharbek Kalantar was an archaeologist and historian, Fellow of the Russian Imperial Archaeological Society, and the keeper of the Asiatic Museum in St. Petersburg.

== Main research ==
The main topics of his research are chaos in non-linear systems, accretion onto massive black holes, stellar dynamics, and observational cosmology.

Gurzadyan has papers predicting elliptical accretion disks formed in galactic nuclei at tidal disruption of stars near massive black holes; the tidal mechanism currently is associated to the flares observed in AGN.

He has shown (with Savvidy; Gurzadyan–Savvidy relaxation) the exponential instability (chaos) in spherical stellar systems and has derived the collective relaxation time. He has formulated a list of 10 key problems in stellar dynamics He has proved a theorem (Gurzadyan theorem) on the most general functional form for the force satisfying the condition of identity of the gravity of the sphere and of a point mass located in the sphere's center.

Cosmic microwave background indications for cosmic voids were obtained by Gurzadyan et al., including on the void nature of the Cold Spot, confirmed by independent galaxy survey, as of possibly the largest known structure in the Universe.

Gurzadyan has suggested and initiated the use of Compton Edge method for high accuracy testing of the light speed isotropy and the Lorentz invariance at GRAAL experiment in European Synchrotron Radiation Facility (Grenoble); the obtained limit became a reference number for Special Relativity extension models.

== Other topics ==
Gurzadyan invented the concept of information panspermia which Webb attributed as Solution 23 of the Fermi Paradox. That concept includes the hypothesis that the Universe can be full of traveling extraterrestrial life streams as low-complexity compressed bit strings at von Neumann automata network. He has shown that human genome and hence the terrestrial life possess low Kolmogorov complexity and hence the corresponding bit strings can be transmitted by an Arecibo-type antenna to Galactic distances.

Gurzadyan and Penrose discussed information panspermia within the Conformal Cyclic Cosmology, and the cosmic microwave background radiation transferring information from pre-Big Bang aeon to ours.

He led a study with geneticists in Duke University introducing a new method to detect somatic mutations in genomic sequences, in proposing bath-quantum system viewpoint on the relation of thermodynamic and cosmological arrows of time.

== Revealing the chronology of ancient world with astronomical dating ==
Gurzadyan's collaboration with archaeologists on the Chronology of the ancient Near East and his analysis of the Venus tablet of Ammisaduqa and of lunar eclipses of the Third Dynasty of Ur led to the introducing of the Ultra-Low chronology of the 2nd-millennium ancient Near East.

He identified Halley's Comet depicted on ancient coins of Armenian king Tigranes the Great, I c. BC. as the earliest known image of that comet He revealed the observation of supernova SN 1054 (progenitor of Crab Nebula) in Armenian medieval chronicle of Hetum (Hayton of Corycus) and Cronaca Rampona.

== Activities ==
Member of Euroscience Governing Board (elected in 1998, reelected in 2002). Chair of organizing committees of workshops such as "Ergodic Concepts in Stellar Dynamics", Geneva, 1993; "The Chaotic Universe", Rome, 1999; "Fermi and Astrophysics", Rome-Pescara, 2001; IX Marcel Grossmann meeting, Rome 2000, chair of 'Chaos' Parallel sessions at Marcel Grossmann Meetings, Jerusalem, 1997, Rome, 2000, Rio de Janeiro, 2003, Berlin, 2006. Paris, 2009. Co-editor of International Journal of Modern Physics D (World Scientific, 2000-2010), of The European Physical Journal Plus (Springer) and of book series 'Advances in Astronomy and Astrophysics' (Taylor & Francis, UK). Fellow of the Royal Astronomical Society (UK).

Speaker at XXII Solvay conference on physics, keynote speaker at IXth Swiss Biennial on Science, Technics + Aesthetics on "The Large, The Small and the Human Mind", lecturer at Xth Brazilian School of Cosmology and Gravitation.
