= Gurzadyan theorem =

Theorem of gravity in cosmology

In cosmology, the Gurzadyan theorem, proved by Vahe Gurzadyan, states the most general functional form for the force satisfying the condition of identity of the gravity of the sphere and of a point mass located in the sphere's center. This theorem thus refers to the first statement of Isaac Newton’s shell theorem (the identity mentioned above) but not the second one, namely, the absence of gravitational force inside a shell.

The theorem had entered and its importance for cosmology outlined in several papers as well as in shell theorem.

== Formula and the cosmological constant ==
The formula for the force derived in has the form

$$F = -\frac{G M m}{r^2} + \frac{\Lambda c^2 m r}{3},$$

where $G$ and $\Lambda$ are constants. The first term is the familiar law of universal gravitation, the second one corresponds to the cosmological constant term in general relativity and McCrea-Milne cosmology. Then the field is force-free only in the center of a shell but the confinement (oscillator) term does not change the initial $O(4)$ symmetry of the Newtonian field. Also, this field corresponds to the only field possessing the property of the Newtonian one: the closing of orbits at any negative value of energy, i.e. the coincidence of the period of variation of the value of the radius vector with that of its revolution by $2\pi$ (resonance principle) .

== Consequences: cosmological constant as a physical constant ==
Einstein named the cosmological constant as a universal constant, introducing it to define the static cosmological model. Einstein has stated: “I should have initially set $\lambda = 0$ in Newton's sense. But the new considerations speak for a non-zero $\lambda$, which strives to bring about a non-zero mean density $\rho_0$ of matter.” This theorem solves that contradiction between “non-zero $\lambda$” and Newton's law.

From this theorem the cosmological constant $\Lambda$ emerges as additional constant of gravity along with the Newton's gravitational constant $G$. Then, the cosmological constant is dimension independent and matter-uncoupled and hence can be considered even more universal than Newton's gravitational constant.

For $\Lambda$ joining the set of fundamental constants $(G, c, \hbar)$, the gravitational Newton's constant, the speed of light and the Planck constant, yields

$$[c]=LT^{-1},\quad [G]=M^{-1}L^3T^{-2},\quad [\hbar]=ML^{2}T^{-1},\quad [\Lambda]=L^{-2},$$

and a dimensionless quantity emerges for the 4-constant set $(G, \Lambda, c, \hbar)$

$$I=\frac{c^{3a}}{\Lambda^a G^a \hbar^a},$$

where $a$ is a real number. Note, no dimensionless quantity is possible to construct from the 3 constants $G, c, \hbar$.

This within a numerical factor, $a=1$, coincides with the information (or entropy) of de Sitter event horizon

$$I_{dS}= 3 \pi \frac {c^3}{\Lambda G \hbar},$$

and the Bekenstein Bound

$$I_{BB} =  \frac {3 \pi c^3}{\Lambda G \hbar ln 2}.$$

=== Rescaling of physical constants ===
Within the conformal cyclic cosmology this theorem implies that, in each aeon of an initial value of $\Lambda$, the values of the 3 physical constants will be eligible for rescaling fulfilling the dimensionless ratio of invariants with respect to the conformal transformation

$$\tilde{g}_{\mu\nu}=\Omega^2 g_{\mu\nu},$$

Then the ratio yields

$$\frac{Q_{dS}}{Q_p}=m (\frac{c^3}{\hbar G \Lambda})^n = m I^n, \quad m,n \in \mathbb{R},$$

for all physical quantities in Planck (initial) and de Sitter (final) eras of the aeons, remaining invariant under conformal transformations.

== Inhomogeneous Fredholm equation ==
This theorem, in the context of nonlocal effects in a system of gravitating particles, leads to the inhomogeneous Dirichlet boundary problem for the Poisson equation

$$\Delta \Phi({\bf x}) = AN G_3 S_3^2
\bigg(\int_{y\in [0,\infty ]}\exp \big(-y^2/(2\theta) \big)y^2 dy
\bigg)\cdot \exp(-\Phi/\theta)-\frac{c^2\Lambda}{2},$$

where $R_\Omega$ is the radius of the region,

$$A,\theta,R_\Omega \in {\mathbb R}^1$$.

Its solution can be expressed in terms of the double layer potential, which leads to an inhomogeneous nonlinear Hammerstein integral equation for the gravitational potential

$$U({\bf x})=\widetilde{\lambda}  \widehat{\mathfrak G}({U})+
\alpha(\theta,\Lambda){\bf x}^2,~~
\widehat{\mathfrak G}({U})\equiv \int_{\Omega'} {\mathcal K}(|{\bf x}-{\bf x}'|)
\exp\big(-{U}({\bf x}')\big)d{{\bf x}'},$$

$$U( {\bf x})\equiv (\Phi ({\bf x})-C_0)/\theta,~~
\widetilde{\lambda} \equiv \widetilde{\lambda_{II}}(\theta)
\equiv \frac{\lambda_{I}}{\theta}\exp(-C_0/\theta),~~
\alpha(\theta,\Lambda)= -\frac{\Lambda c^2}{12\theta}.$$

This leads to a linear inhomogeneous 2nd kind Fredholm equation

$$\phi({\bf x})=\lambda^{(0)} \int_{\Omega'}{\mathcal K}(|{\bf x}-{\bf x}'|)
\phi({\bf x}')d{\bf x}' +\widehat{\beta}({\bf x}),$$

$$\widehat{\beta}({\bf x})\equiv  -\lambda^{(0)}\int_{\Omega'}
{\mathcal K}(|{\bf x}-{\bf x}'|)\alpha |{\bf x}'|^2 d{\bf x}' -\alpha |{\bf x}|^2,$$

$${U}({\bf x})={U}_0-\phi ({\bf x}), ~~|{\phi }|\ll {U}_0;~~~
\lambda^{(0)}\equiv-\widetilde{\lambda}\exp(-U_0).$$

Its solution can be expressed in terms of the resolvent $\Gamma$ of the integral kernel and the non-linear (repulsive) term

$$\phi ({\bf x}) = -\widehat\beta ({\bf x}) +\lambda^{(0)}\sum_{\bf n}
\langle -\widehat\beta ({\bf x}),\phi_{\bf n} \rangle \phi_{\bf n}\lambda_{\bf n}^{-1} + (\lambda^{(0)})^2\sum_{\bf n}\langle -\widehat\beta ({\bf x}),\phi_{\bf n} \rangle
\phi_{\bf n}\lambda_{\bf n}^{-1}(\lambda_{\bf n}-\lambda^{(0)})^{-1} =$$

$$-\widehat\beta ({\bf x}) +
\lambda^{(0)} \int_\Omega
\underbrace{
\bigg( {\mathcal K}({\bf x},{\bf x}') +
\lambda^{(0)}
\sum_{\bf n} \phi_{\bf n}({\bf x}) \phi_{\bf n}({\bf x}')
\lambda_{\bf n}^{-1}(\lambda_{\bf n}-\lambda^{(0)})^{-1}
\bigg)}_{\Gamma ({\bf x},{\bf x}',\lambda^{(0)})}
(-\widehat\beta ({\bf x}))d{\bf x}'.$$

== Observational indications ==
The dynamics of groups and clusters of galaxies are claimed to fit the theorem, see also. The possibility of two Hubble flows, a local one, determined by that formula, and a global one, described by Friedmannian cosmological equations was stated in.

== Experimental consequences of the theorem ==
In ref. it is shown that the theorem provides a possibility to measure at a tabletop scale, using Bose-Einstein condensate (BEC), the gravitational constant with an accuracy of up to 10^-17 N m^2/kg^2 and to establish an upper bound on the cosmological constant 10^-31 m^-2.
