= Gurzadyan–Savvidy relaxation =

In cosmology, Gurzadyan–Savvidy (GS) relaxation is a theory developed by Vahe Gurzadyan and George Savvidy to explain the relaxation over time of the dynamics of N-body gravitating systems such as star clusters and galaxies. Stellar systems observed in the Universe – globular clusters and elliptical galaxies – reveal their relaxed state reflected in the high degree of regularity of some of their physical characteristics such as surface luminosity, velocity dispersion, geometric shapes, etc. The basic mechanism of relaxation of stellar systems has been considered the 2-body encounters (of stars), to lead to the observed fine-grained equilibrium. The coarse-grained phase of evolution of gravitating systems is described by violent relaxation developed by Donald Lynden-Bell. The 2-body mechanism of relaxation is known in plasma physics. The difficulties with description of collective effects in N-body gravitating systems arise due to the long-range character of gravitational interaction, as distinct of plasma where due to two different signs of charges the Debye screening takes place. The 2-body relaxation mechanism e.g. for elliptical galaxies predicts around $10^{13}$ years i.e. time scales exceeding the age of the Universe. The problem of relaxation and evolution of stellar systems and the role of collective effects are studied by various techniques, see. Among the efficient methods of study of N-body gravitating systems are the numerical simulations, particularly, Sverre Aarseth's N-body codes are widely used.

== Stellar system time scales ==
Using the geometric methods of theory of dynamical systems, Gurzadyan and Savvidy showed the exponential instability (chaos) of spherical N-body systems interacting by Newtonian gravity and derived the collective (N-body) relaxation time (see also)

$$\tau_{GS}=\left(\frac{15}{4}\right)^{2/3}\left(\frac{1}{2\pi\sqrt2}\frac{v}{GMn^{2/3}}\right),$$

where $v$ denotes the average stellar velocity, $M$ is the mean stellar mass and $n$ is the stellar density. Normalized for parameters of stellar systems like globular clusters it yields

$$\tau_{GS} \simeq 10^8 \text{year} \left(\frac{v}{10 \text{km/sec}}\right)\left(\frac{n}{1 \text{pc}^{-3}}\right)^{-2/3} \left(\frac{M}{M_{\odot}}\right)^{-1}.$$

For clusters of galaxies it yields 10-1000 Gyr. Comparing this (GS) relaxation time to the 2-body relaxation time (see)

$$\tau_{2b}=\frac{\sqrt 2 v^3}{\pi G^2M^2 n ln(N/2)},$$

Gurzadyan and Savvidy obtain

$$\frac{\tau_{2b}}{\tau_{GS}}\simeq\frac{v^2}{GMn^{1/3}}\frac{1}{lnN}\simeq\frac{d}{r_*}\frac{1}{lnN},$$

where $r_*=GM/v^2$ is the radius of gravitational influence and d is the mean distance between stars. With increasing density, d decreases and approaches $r_*$ so that the 2-body encounters become the dominant in the relaxation mechanism. The times $\tau_{GS}$ and $\tau_{2b}$ are related to the dynamical time $\tau_{dyn}=D^{3/2}{GMN}^{1/2}$ by the relations

$$\tau_{GS}\simeq\frac{D}{d}\tau_{dyn}, \quad \tau_{2b}\simeq\frac{D}{r_*}\tau_{dyn},$$

and reflect the fact of existence of 3 scales of time and length for stellar systems (see also)

$$D:\tau_{dyn} \quad; \quad d:\tau_{GS} \quad; \quad r_{*}: \tau_{2b}.$$

That approach (from the analysis of so-called two-dimensional curvature of the configuration space of the system) enabled to conclude that while the spherical systems are exponentially instable systems (Kolmogorov K-systems), the spiral galaxies "spend a large amount of time in regions with positive two-dimensional curvature" and hence "elliptical and spiral galaxies should have a different origin". Within the same geometric approach Gurzadyan and Armen Kocharyan had introduced the Ricci curvature criterion for relative instability (chaos) of dynamical systems.

== Derivation of GS-time scale by stochastic differential equation approach ==
GS-time scale $\tau_{GS}=\tau_{dyn} N^{1/3}$ has been rederived by Gurzadyan and Kocharyan using stochastic differential equation approach

== Observational indication and numerical simulations ==
Observational support to the GS-time scale is reported for globular clusters. Numerical simulations supporting GS-time scale are claimed in.
