= Information panspermia =

Concept in physics

Information panspermia is the concept of life forms travelling across the universe by means of transmission of compressed information representing said life forms e.g. via genome coding, which can then enable the recovery of intelligent life.

== Name ==
The concept was invented and coined by Vahe Gurzadyan, and then listed by Stephen Webb as Solution 23 to the Fermi paradox: "The Armenian mathematical physicist Vahe Gurzadyan has posited an interesting hypothesis: we might inhabit a Galaxy 'full of traveling life streams' – strings of bits beamed throughout space."

== Background ==
Kolmogorov complexity is defined as the length of the shortest computer program which enables the complete recovery of an object. Gurzadyan showed that the complexity of the human genome is relatively low due to non-random parts in the genomic sequences. Moreover, he noticed that since the genomic information on the terrestrial life, starting from bacteria up to humans, contains essential common parts, the entire terrestrial life information can be compressed and transmitted, as he estimated, to over Galactic distances via Arecibo-type antenna. Von Neumann automata networks or some other mechanism can perform the decoding of the information package. Within this concept, one can even assume that terrestrial life itself might be a result of such an information package.

Information panspermia has been discussed by Gurzadyan and Roger Penrose within the scheme of Conformal Cyclic Cosmology, i.e. the possibility of transmission of information from pre-Big Bang aeon to ours via the cosmic microwave background radiation.

== Influence on strategy of analysis of intelligent signals ==
This concept assumes a different strategy of the study of the cosmic signals based on universal compressing and decoding principles. Information panspermia is discussed in:

"Gurzadyan’s idea offers a straightforward practical consequence: we should study alleged SETI signals from the point of view of the algorithmic information theory and we should try to identify and decode possible bit strings hidden in the noise."
