= The Large, the Small and the Human Mind =

Book by Roger Penrose

The Large, the Small, and the Human Mind
- Cover of the hardcover edition
- Author: Roger Penrose
- Language: English
- Subject: Popular science
- Publisher: Cambridge University Press
- Publication date: 1997
- Media type: Print
- Pages: 224 pp.
- ISBN: 978-0521785723

The Large, the Small, and the Human Mind is a popular science book by British theoretical physicist Roger Penrose. The book was published by Cambridge University Press in 1997.

== Overview ==
The book includes criticism of his work on physics and consciousness by Abner Shimony, Nancy Cartwright, and Stephen Hawking. The book was preceded by The Emperor's New Mind, published in 1989, and Shadows of the Mind, published in 1994.
