= Hadwiger conjecture (combinatorial geometry) =

A triangle can be covered by three smaller copies of itself; a square requires four smaller copies

Unsolved problem in mathematics
Can every $n$-dimensional convex body be covered by $2^n$ smaller copies of itself?
More unsolved problems in mathematics

In combinatorial geometry, the Hadwiger conjecture states that any convex body in n-dimensional Euclidean space can be covered by 2^{n} or fewer smaller bodies homothetic with the original body, and that furthermore, the upper bound of 2^{n} is necessary if and only if the body is a parallelepiped. There also exists an equivalent formulation in terms of the number of floodlights needed to illuminate the body.

The Hadwiger conjecture is named after Hugo Hadwiger, who included it on a list of unsolved problems in 1957; it was, however, previously studied by Levi (1955) and independently, Gohberg & Markus (1960). Additionally, there is a different Hadwiger conjecture concerning graph coloring, and in some sources the geometric Hadwiger conjecture is also called the Levi–Hadwiger conjecture or the Hadwiger–Levi covering problem.

The conjecture remains unsolved even in three dimensions, though the two-dimensional case was resolved by Levi (1955).

== Formal statement ==
Formally, the Hadwiger conjecture is: If K is any bounded convex set in the n-dimensional Euclidean space R^{n}, then there exists a set of 2^{n} scalars s_{i} and a set of 2^{n} translation vectors v_{i} such that all s_{i} lie in the range 0 < s_{i} < 1 and

$$K\subseteq\bigcup_{i=1}^{2^n} s_i K + v_i.$$

Furthermore, the upper bound is necessary if and only if K is a parallelepiped, in which case all 2^{n} of the scalars may be chosen to be equal to 1/2.

=== Alternate formulation with illumination ===
As shown by Boltyansky, the problem is equivalent to one of illumination: how many floodlights must be placed outside of an opaque convex body in order to completely illuminate its exterior? For the purposes of this problem, a body is only considered to be illuminated if for each point of the boundary of the body, there is at least one floodlight that is separated from the body by all of the tangent planes intersecting the body on this point; thus, although the faces of a cube may be lit by only two floodlights, the planes tangent to its vertices and edges cause it to need many more lights in order for it to be fully illuminated. For any convex body, the number of floodlights needed to completely illuminate it turns out to equal the number of smaller copies of the body that are needed to cover it.

== Examples ==
As shown in the illustration, a triangle may be covered by three smaller copies of itself, and more generally in any dimension a simplex may be covered by n + 1 copies of itself, scaled by a factor of n/(n + 1). However, covering a square by smaller squares (with parallel sides to the original) requires four smaller squares, as each one can cover only one of the larger square's four corners. In higher dimensions, covering a hypercube or more generally a parallelepiped by smaller homothetic copies of the same shape requires a separate copy for each of the vertices of the original hypercube or parallelepiped; because these shapes have 2^{n} vertices, 2^{n} smaller copies are necessary. This number is also sufficient: a cube or parallelepiped may be covered by 2^{n} copies, scaled by a factor of 1/2. Hadwiger's conjecture is that parallelepipeds are the worst case for this problem, and that any other convex body may be covered by fewer than 2^{n} smaller copies of itself.

== Known results ==
The two-dimensional case was settled by Levi (1955): every two-dimensional bounded convex set may be covered with four smaller copies of itself, with the fourth copy needed only in the case of parallelograms. However, the conjecture remains open in higher dimensions except for some special cases. The best known asymptotic upper bound on the number of smaller copies needed to cover a given body is
$$\displaystyle 4^n\exp\frac{-cn}{\log^8 n},$$
where $c$ is a positive constant. For small $n$ the upper bound of $(n+1)n^{n-1}-(n-1)(n-2)^{n-1}$ established by Lassak (1988) is better than the asymptotic one. In three dimensions it was shown by Papadoperakis (1999) that 16 copies always suffice and then by Prymak (2023) that 14 copies always suffice, but this is still far from the conjectured bound of 8 copies.

The conjecture is known to hold for certain special classes of convex bodies, including, in dimension three, centrally symmetric polyhedra and bodies of constant width. The number of copies needed to cover any zonotope (other than a parallelepiped) is at most $(3/4)2^n$, while for bodies with a smooth surface (that is, having a single tangent plane per boundary point), at most $n+1$ smaller copies are needed to cover the body, as Levi already proved.

== See also ==
- Borsuk's conjecture on covering convex bodies with sets of smaller diameter
