= The Road to Reality =

Book by Roger Penrose

The Road to Reality: A Complete Guide to the Laws of the Universe.
- Cover of the 2007 hardcover edition
- Author: Roger Penrose
- Language: English
- Subject: Modern physics
- Publisher: Jonathan Cape
- Publication date: 2004; Later revised editions: 2005, 2006, 2007
- Publication place: UK
- Media type: Print, e-book
- Pages: 1094 pp.
- ISBN: 0-224-04447-8
- Preceded by: Shadows of the Mind
- Followed by: Cycles of Time

The Road to Reality: A Complete Guide to the Laws of the Universe is an introduction to modern mathematical physics by the British mathematical physicist Roger Penrose, published in 2004. It covers the basics of the Standard Model of particle physics, discussing general relativity and quantum mechanics, and discusses the possible unification of these two theories.

== Overview ==
The book discusses the physical world. Many fields that 19th century scientists believed were separate, such as electricity and magnetism, are aspects of more fundamental properties. Some texts, both popular and university level, introduce these topics as separate concepts, and then reveal their combination much later. The Road to Reality reverses this process, first expounding the underlying mathematics of space–time, then showing how electromagnetism and other phenomena fall out fully formed.

The book is just over 1100 pages, of which the first 383 are dedicated to mathematics—Penrose's goal is to acquaint inquisitive readers with the mathematical tools needed to understand the remainder of the book in depth. Physics enters the discussion on page 383 with the topic of spacetime. From there it moves on to fields in spacetime, deriving the classical electrical and magnetic forces from first principles; that is, if one lives in spacetime of a particular sort, these fields develop naturally as a consequence. Energy and conservation laws appear in the discussion of Lagrangians and Hamiltonians, before moving on to a full discussion of quantum physics, particle theory and quantum field theory. A discussion of the measurement problem in quantum mechanics is given a full chapter; superstrings are given a chapter near the end of the book, as are loop gravity and twistor theory. The book ends with an exploration of other theories and possible ways forward.

The final chapters reflect Penrose's personal perspective, which differs in some respects from what he regards as the current fashion among theoretical physicists. He is skeptical about string theory, to which he prefers loop quantum gravity. He is optimistic about his own approach, twistor theory. He also holds some controversial views about the role of consciousness in physics, as laid out in his earlier books (see Shadows of the Mind).

Unusually for a popular science book, mathematics and theoretical physics exercises are set for the reader. These were ranked according to difficulty, from “very straight forward” to “not to be taken lightly”. The preface of early editions indicated the solutions would be published at www.roadsolutions.ox.ac.uk (preface, page xx). However only the solutions to the problems in the second and third chapter were provided, credited to then-PhD student Nicholas Iles, before this site eventually went offline.

== Reception ==
According to Brian Blank:

For mathematicians with a general interest in physics, Penrose’s book will be self-recommending. Other mathematicians may find it useful to scan The Road to Reality, if only to glimpse the extent to which mathematical constructs infuse theoretical physics. There are a great many competing books that seek to explain the state of the art in fundamental physics. If you compare Penrose’s work to any of the recent ones ... then you will understand a reviewer’s inclination to hold The Road to Reality up to the highest standards, for it is, indeed, sui generis. And that makes my bottom-line recommendation a cinch. For anybody who wants to learn up-to-date physics at a level between standard popularization and graduate text, The Road to Reality is the only book in town.

According to Nicholas Lezard:

If it is a quality of a great writer not to treat the audience like idiots, then Penrose is indeed great, and the position of this book on the bestseller lists makes sense.

According to Lee Smolin:

Penrose is uniquely honest in mentioning the weak points and gaps in his own favored ideas. He reminds us of an earlier era before physicists learned to aggressively hype their ideas, an era in which the prevailing ethic called for honestly explaining the pros and cons and letting the ideas and results speak for themselves.
At the core of Penrose’s thinking are arguments that lead him to believe that quantum mechanics must be modified to be unified with gravity. This idea leads him to reject both string theory and such competing approaches as loop-quantum gravity. More than that, he rejects a governing assumption of almost all post–standard model theorizing, which is that such foundational challenges as the measurement problem and quantum gravity can be ignored while physicists work on the problem of unification. Although Penrose’s proposal for modifying quantum theory may or may not succeed, it has a feature string theory so far lacks: a doable experiment to test it.

George Johnson wrote in The New York Times:

The result -- if you can make your way through -- is a comprehensive guide to physics' big picture, and to the thoughts of one of the world's most original thinkers ... This is the book alien archaeologists may study for a rigorous, comprehensive view of how the 21st-century inhabitants of the third rock from the sun believed the world worked.

According to Frank Wilczek:

Regarded as a scientific treatise, The Road to Reality is in many ways problematic. By nominally addressing a substantive discussion of frontier issues in theoretical physics and cosmology to a popular audience, an author deprives himself of the discipline of having to provide details, to address concrete experimental issues, or to pitch the level of his argumentation to peers capable of judging them critically. Galileo pulled this off brilliantly, but times were much simpler then! The worst parts of the book are the chapters on high-energy physics and quantum field theory, which in spite of their brevity contain several serious blunders: The Cabibbo angle does not govern the mixing of K^{0} and K̅^{0} mesons to make the long- and short-lived Ks. There are not alternative directions of electroweak symmetry breaking. And no associated disorder arises at that symmetry-breaking transition, any more than at the analogous transition in ordinary superconductors.
To summarize, there’s much to admire and profit from in this remarkable book, but judged by the highest standards The Road to Reality is deeply flawed.

== Editions ==
- Jonathan Cape (1st edition), 2004, hardcover, ISBN 0-224-04447-8
- Alfred A. Knopf (publisher), February 2005, hardcover, ISBN 0-679-45443-8
- Vintage Books, 2005, softcover, ISBN 0-09-944068-7
- Vintage Books, 2006, softcover, ISBN 0-09-944068-7
- Vintage Books, 2007, softcover, ISBN 0-679-77631-1
