= Krzysztof Antoni Meissner =

Polish physicist (born 1961)

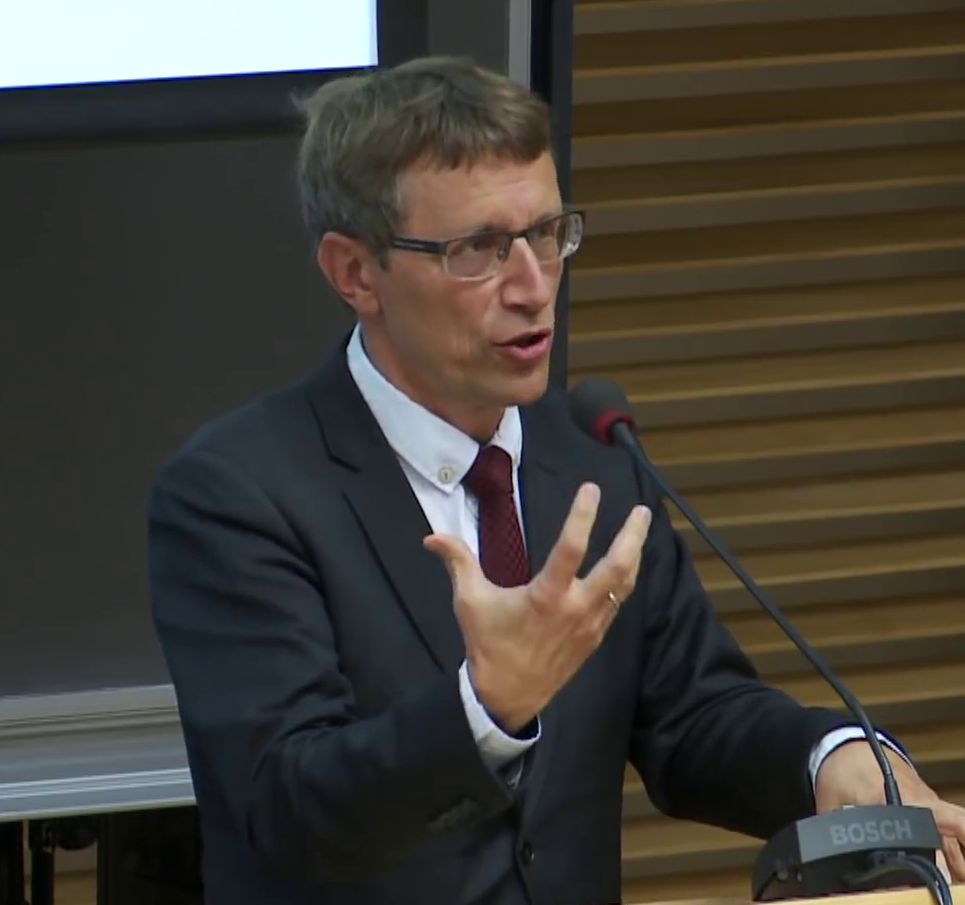
Krzysztof Antoni Meissner

Krzysztof Antoni Meissner (born 1 September 1961 in Warsaw, Poland) is a Polish theoretical physicist, specializing in elementary particles theory, and a professor of physics at the University of Warsaw, Faculty of Physics, Institute of Theoretical Physics.

== Career ==
In his youth, Meissner was twice a laureate of the Polish Physics Olympiad and twice a finalist of Polish Chemistry Olimpiad. He started studying physics at University of Warsaw, Faculty of Physics, in 1980, obtained his Master's degree in 1985 and was immediately employed as an assistant in Institute of Theoretical Physics, Department of Elementary Particles and Forces Theory. He continued his scientific work, defending his PhD thesis in 1989, habilitating in 1997 with a dissertation titled The Role of Symmetry of Noncritical Strings Theory in String Cosmology (Rola Symetrii Teorii Strun Niekrytycznych w Kosmologii Strunowej) and becoming a professor in 2006. He is a long-term collaborator of Sir Roger Penrose. He became the scientific director of the Institute of Nuclear Research in 2009, and after its transformation into National Centre of Nuclear Research, he continues to work there, although no longer as a scientific director.

== Publications ==
He has authored or co-authored over 70 papers published in science journals, amongst them Physical Review Letters, Physical Review D, Classical and Quantum Gravity, Nuclear Physics, Physics Letters B.

== Other work and achievements ==
Krzysztof Meissner is openly religious, saying "Physicists, a theist and an atheist, use the same equations describing the same phenomenon and arrive at the same conclusions. The difference is, one of them will say that it is a reflection of the perfect God, while the other will simply consider it the way things are." He is also working to popularize science and physics in Poland, giving many public speeches in schools and public events. In 2013, he was awarded the Order of Polonia Restituta by President of Poland, Bronisław Komorowski for outstanding contribution to research in the field of physics and to popularization of science.
