= Conformal cyclic cosmology =

Cosmological model

Conformal cyclic cosmology (CCC) is a speculative cyclocosmic cosmological model in the framework of general relativity, proposed by the theoretical physicist Roger Penrose. In CCC the universe iterates through infinite cycles, with the future timelike infinity (the latest end of any possible timescale evaluated for any point in space) of each previous iteration being identified with the Big Bang singularity of the next. Penrose popularized this theory in his 2010 book Cycles of Time: An Extraordinary New View of the Universe. It has not been accepted in the wider cosmological community, and there is no generally accepted observational evidence for it.

== Basic construction ==
Penrose's basic construction is to connect a countable sequence of open Friedmann–Lemaître–Robertson–Walker metric (FLRW) spacetimes, each representing a Big Bang followed by an infinite future expansion. Penrose noticed that the past conformal boundary of one copy of FLRW spacetime can be "attached" to the future conformal boundary of another, after an appropriate conformal rescaling. In particular, each individual FLRW metric $g_{ab}$ is multiplied by the square of a conformal factor $\Omega$ that approaches zero at timelike infinity, effectively "squashing down" the future conformal boundary to a conformally regular hypersurface (which is spacelike if there is a positive cosmological constant, as is currently believed). The result is a new solution to Einstein's equations, which Penrose takes to represent the entire universe, and which is composed of a sequence of sectors that Penrose calls "aeons".

The conformal cyclic cosmology hypothesis requires that all massive particles eventually vanish from existence, including those which become too widely separated from all other particles to annihilate with them. As Penrose points out, proton decay is a possibility contemplated in various speculative extensions of the Standard Model, but it has never been observed. Moreover, all electrons must also decay, or lose their charge and/or mass, and no conventional speculations allow for this.

In his Nobel Prize Lecture video, Roger Penrose moderated his previous requirement for no mass, beginning at 26:30 in the video, allowing some mass particles to be present as long as the amounts are insignificant with nearly all of their energy being kinetic, and in a conformal geometry dominated by photons.

== Physical implications ==
The significant feature of this construction for particle physics is that, since bosons obey the laws of conformally invariant quantum theory, they will behave in the same way in the rescaled aeons as in their former FLRW counterparts (classically, this corresponds to light-cone structures being preserved under conformal rescaling). For such particles, the boundary between aeons is not a boundary at all, but just a spacelike surface that can be passed across like any other. Fermions, on the other hand, remain confined to a given aeon, thus providing a convenient solution to the black hole information paradox; according to Penrose, fermions must be irreversibly converted into radiation during black hole evaporation, to preserve the smoothness of the boundary between aeons.

The curvature properties of Penrose's cosmology are also convenient for other aspects of cosmology. First, the boundary between aeons satisfies the Weyl curvature hypothesis, thus providing a certain kind of low-entropy past as required by the past hypothesis, statistical mechanics and observation. Second, Penrose has calculated that a certain amount of gravitational radiation should be preserved across the boundary between aeons. Penrose suggests this extra gravitational radiation may be enough to explain the observed cosmic acceleration without appeal to a dark energy field.

== Empirical tests ==
In 2010 Penrose and Vahe Gurzadyan published a preprint of a paper claiming that observations of the cosmic microwave background (CMB) made by the Wilkinson Microwave Anisotropy Probe (WMAP) and the BOOMERanG experiment contained an excess of concentric circles compared to simulations based on the standard Lambda-CDM model of cosmology, quoting a 6-sigma significance of the result. However, the statistical significance of the claimed detection has since been disputed. Three groups have independently attempted to reproduce these results, but found that the detection of the concentric anomalies was not statistically significant, in that no more concentric circles appeared in the data than in Lambda-CDM simulations.

The reason for the disagreement was tracked down to an issue of how to construct the simulations that are used to determine the significance: The three independent attempts to repeat the analysis all used simulations based on the standard Lambda-CDM model, while Penrose and Gurzadyan used an undocumented non-standard approach.

In 2013 Gurzadyan and Penrose published the further development of their work introducing a new method they termed the "sky-twist procedure" (not based on simulations) in which WMAP data is directly analysed; in 2015, they published the results of Planck data analysis confirming those of WMAP, including the inhomogeneous sky distribution of those structures.

In a 2018 paper authors Daniel An, Krzysztof Antoni Meissner, Paweł Nurowski, and Penrose presented a continued analysis of the CMB data as it seemed to them that “anomalous points provide an important new input to cosmology, irrespective of the validity of CCC.” They also suggested that those anomalies could be "Hawking points", remnant signals from the "Hawking evaporation of supermassive black holes in the aeon prior to ours". The original version of their paper claimed that a B-mode location found by the BICEP2 team was located at one of these Hawking points; this claim was removed in a later update. A 2020 analysis found that the ostensibly anomalous "Hawking points" were actually consistent with the standard inflationary picture once the look-elsewhere effect is taken into account, therefore arguing that they could not be used as evidence for CCC.

Anomalies due to a few bright or dark pixels may alter the conclusions of analysis of the CMB data. Statistical re-analysis of the Planck and WMAP CMB data in 2024 found no low-variance circles. Concerning Hawking points, they also state no statistically significant evidence when using a Gaussian temperature amplitude model over 1 degree opening angle and after accounting for CMB anomalies. The absence of such distinct features in the CMB does not disprove CCC.

== CCC and the Fermi paradox ==
In 2015 Gurzadyan and Penrose also discussed the Fermi paradox, the apparent contradiction between the lack of evidence but high probability estimates for the existence of extraterrestrial civilizations. Within conformal cyclic cosmology, the cosmic microwave background provides the possibility of information transfer from one aeon to another, including of intelligent signals within the information panspermia concept.

== See also ==
- Cycles of Time: An Extraordinary New View of the Universe
- Fashion, Faith, and Fantasy in the New Physics of the Universe
- Black hole information paradox
- Conformal geometry
- Cyclic model
- Shape dynamics
- White hole
