= Fashion, Faith, and Fantasy in the New Physics of the Universe =

Book by Roger Penrose

- Author: Roger Penrose
- Language: English
- Subjects: Physics, string theory, cosmology
- Publisher: Princeton University Press
- Publication date: September 2016
- Publication place: United States
- Media type: Print (Hardcover), e-book
- Pages: 512 pp.
- ISBN: 978-0691119793
- Preceded by: Cycles of Time

Fashion, Faith, and Fantasy in the New Physics of the Universe is a book by mathematical physicist Roger Penrose, released in September 2016. The book is based on his lectures that he gave at Princeton University in 2003.

== Content ==
The first three Chapters discussed three important theories with the feature of fashion, faith and fantasy, respectively. They are the string theory (fashion), quantum mechanics (faith) and the current cosmology theory (fantasy). From Chapter 4, Penrose introduced his own theory, including the controversial Conformal Cyclic Cosmology.

The book is aimed for general readers, and the text is non-technical.

== Reception ==
A reviewer of Publishers Weekly stated "Acclaimed English mathematical physicist Penrose ... gets to the heart of modern physics’ problem with subjectivity in this insightful and provocative pop-sci title... He writes with clarity and authority in this dense but rewarding discussion of scientific stumbles in the search for truth." Graham Farmelo of The Guardian commented "It seems from Faith, Fashion and Fantasy that Penrose has not felt comfortable with any of the radical new ideas in fundamental physics that have been set out in the past 40 years."
