= Cycles of Time =

Book by Roger Penrose

Cycles of Time: An Extraordinary New View of the Universe
- Bodley Head 1st edition front cover
- Author: Roger Penrose
- Cover artist: Getty Images
- Language: English
- Subjects: Science, Mathematics, Cosmology, Physics
- Publisher: Bodley Head (UK); Knopf (US)
- Publication date: 23 September 2010; 3 May 2011 (US)
- Publication place: United Kingdom
- Media type: Print (Hardcover)
- Pages: 288 pp.
- ISBN: 978-0-224-08036-1
- LC Class: QB991.C92 P46 2010
- Preceded by: The Road to Reality
- Followed by: Fashion, Faith, and Fantasy in the New Physics of the Universe

Cycles of Time: An Extraordinary New View of the Universe is a science book by mathematical physicist Roger Penrose published by The Bodley Head in 2010. The book outlines Penrose's Conformal Cyclic Cosmology (CCC) model, which is an extension of general relativity but opposed to the widely supported multidimensional string theories and cosmological inflation following the Big Bang.

== Synopsis ==
Penrose examines implications of the Second Law of Thermodynamics and its inevitable march toward a maximum entropy state of the universe. Penrose illustrates entropy in terms of information state phase space (with 1 dimension for every degree of freedom) where particles end up moving through ever larger grains of this phase space from smaller grains over time due to random motion. He disagrees with Stephen Hawking's back-track over whether information is destroyed when matter enters black holes. Such information loss would non-trivially lower total entropy in the universe as the black holes wither away due to Hawking radiation, resulting in a loss in phase space degrees of freedom.

Penrose goes on further to state that over enormous scales of time (beyond 10^{100} years), distance ceases to be meaningful as all mass breaks down into extremely red-shifted photon energy, whereupon time has no influence, and the universe continues to expand infinitely with no further events taking place. This period from Big Bang to infinite expansion Penrose defines as an aeon. The smooth "hairless" infinite oblivion of the previous aeon becomes the low-entropy Big Bang state of the next aeon cycle. Conformal geometry preserves the angles but not the distances of the previous aeon, allowing the new aeon universe to appear quite small at its inception as its phase space starts anew.

Penrose cites concentric rings found in the WMAP cosmic microwave background survey as preliminary evidence for his model, as he predicted black hole collisions from the previous aeon would leave such structures due to ripples of gravitational waves.

== Reception ==
Most nonexpert critics (nonscientists) have found the book a challenge to fully comprehend; a few such as Kirkus Reviews and Doug Johnstone for The Scotsman appreciate the against the grain innovative ideas Penrose puts forth. Manjit Kumar reviewing for The Guardian admires the Russian doll geometry play of the CCC concept, framing it as an idea of which M. C. Escher "would have approved". Graham Storrs for the New York Journal of Books concedes that this is not the book that an unambitious lay person should plunge into. The American fiction writer Anthony Doerr in The Boston Globe writes "Penrose has never shied away from including mathematics in his texts, and kudos to his publisher for honoring that wish. That said, the second half of Cycles of Time offers some seriously hard sledding"; "If you'll forgive a skiing metaphor, Cycles of Time is a black diamond of a book."
