= Stellar density =

Number of stars within a unit volume

Stellar density is the average number of stars within a unit volume. It is similar to the stellar mass density, which is the total solar masses (M_{Sun}) found within a unit volume. Typically, the volume used by astronomers to describe the stellar density is a cubic parsec (pc^{3}).

In the solar neighborhood, this value can be determined from surveys of nearby stars, combined with estimates of the number of faint stars that may have been missed. The true stellar density near the Sun is estimated as 0.004 stars per cubic light year, or 0.14 stars pc^{−3}. When combined with estimates of the stellar masses, this yields a mass density estimate of 4×10^{−24} g/cm^{3} or 0.059 solar masses per cubic parsec. The density estimate varies across space, with the density decreasing rapidly in the direction out of the galactic plane.

The locations within the Milky Way that have the highest stellar density are the galactic core and the center of globular clusters. A typical mass density for a globular cluster is 70 M_{Sun} pc^{−3}, which is 500 times the mass density near the Sun. In the solar neighborhood, the stellar density of a star cluster must be greater than 0.08 M_{Sun} pc^{−3} in order to avoid tidal disruption.
