= Rietdijk–Putnam argument =

Philosophical argument based on the theory of relativity

In philosophy, the Rietdijk–Putnam argument, named after C. Wim Rietdijk and Hilary Putnam, uses 20th-century findings in physics – specifically in special relativity – to support the philosophical position known as four-dimensionalism.

If special relativity is applied to all space and time, then each observer will have their own plane of simultaneity, which contains a unique set of events that constitutes the observer's present moment. Observers moving at different relative velocities have different planes of simultaneity, and hence different sets of events that are present. Each observer considers their set of present events to be a three-dimensional universe, but even the slightest movement of the head or offset in distance between observers can cause the three-dimensional universes to have differing content. If each three-dimensional universe exists, then the existence of multiple three-dimensional universes suggests that the universe is four-dimensional. The argument is named after the discussions by Rietdijk (1966) and Putnam (1967). It is sometimes called the Rietdijk–Putnam–Penrose argument.

== Andromeda paradox ==
Roger Penrose advanced a form of this argument that has been called the Andromeda paradox in which he points out that two people walking past each other on the street could have very different present moments. If one of the people were walking towards the Andromeda Galaxy, then events in this galaxy might be hours or even days behind the events on Andromeda for the person walking away from the galaxy. If this occurs, it would have dramatic effects on our understanding of time. Penrose highlighted the consequences by discussing a potential invasion of Earth by aliens living in the Andromeda Galaxy. As Penrose put it:

Two people pass each other on the street; and according to one of the two people, an Andromedean space fleet has already set off on its journey, while to the other, the decision as to whether or not the journey will actually take place has not yet been made. How can there still be some uncertainty as to the outcome of that decision? If to either person the decision has already been made, then surely there cannot be any uncertainty. The launching of the space fleet is an inevitability. In fact neither of the people can yet know of the launching of the space fleet. They can know only later, when telescopic observations from Earth reveal that the fleet is indeed on its way. Then they can hark back to that chance encounter, and come to the conclusion that at that time, according to one of them, the decision lay in the uncertain future, while to the other, it lay in the certain past. Was there then any uncertainty about that future? Or was the future of both people already "fixed"?

— Roger Penrose, The Emperor's New Mind: Concerning Computers, Minds, and the Laws of Physics

The "paradox" consists of two observers who are, from their conscious perspective, in the same place and at the same instant having different sets of events in their "present moment". Note that neither observer can actually "see" what is happening in Andromeda, because light from Andromeda (and the hypothetical alien fleet) will take over 2.5 million years to reach Earth. The argument is not about what can be "seen"; it is purely about what events different observers consider to occur in the present moment.

The concept can be visualized intuitively using the geometric representation offered by a Minkowski diagram.

== Criticisms ==
The interpretations of relativity used in the Rietdijk–Putnam argument and the Andromeda paradox are not universally accepted. Howard Stein and Steven F. Savitt note that in relativity the present is a local concept that cannot be extended to global hyperplanes. Furthermore, N. David Mermin states:

That no inherent meaning can be assigned to the simultaneity of distant events is the single most important lesson to be learned from relativity.

— David Mermin, It's About Time
