= Illumination problem =

Mathematical study of illumination of rooms with mirrored walls

Roger Penrose's solution of the illumination problem using elliptical arcs (blue) and straight line segments (green), with 3 positions of the single light source (red spot). The purple crosses are the foci of the larger arcs. Lit and unlit regions are shown in yellow and grey respectively.

Illumination problems are a class of mathematical problems that study the illumination of rooms with mirrored walls by point light sources.

== Original formulation ==
The original formulation was attributed to Ernst Straus in the 1950s and has been resolved. Straus asked whether a room with mirrored walls can always be illuminated by a single point light source, allowing for repeated reflection of light off the mirrored walls. Alternatively, the question can be stated as asking that if a billiard table can be constructed in any required shape, is there a shape possible such that there is a point where it is impossible to hit the billiard ball at another point, assuming the ball is point-like and continues infinitely rather than stopping due to friction.

== Penrose unilluminable room ==
The original problem was first solved in 1958 by Roger Penrose using ellipses to form the Penrose unilluminable room. He showed that there exists a room with curved walls that must always have dark regions if lit only by a single point source.

== Polygonal rooms ==
Solutions to the illumination problem by George W. Tokarsky (26 sides) and David Castro (24 sides)

This problem was also solved for polygonal rooms by George Tokarsky in 1995 for 2 and 3 dimensions, which showed that there exists an unilluminable polygonal 26-sided room with a "dark spot" which is not illuminated from another point in the room, even allowing for repeated reflections. These were rare cases, when a finite number of dark points (rather than regions) are unilluminable only from a fixed position of the point source.

In 1995, Tokarsky found the first polygonal unilluminable room which had 4 sides and two fixed boundary points. He also in 1996 found a 20-sided unilluminable room with two distinct interior points. In 1997, two different 24-sided rooms with the same properties were put forward by George Tokarsky and David Castro separately.

In 2016, Samuel Lelièvre, Thierry Monteil, and Barak Weiss showed that a light source in a polygonal room whose angles (in degrees) are all rational numbers will illuminate the entire polygon, with the possible exception of a finite number of points. In 2019 this was strengthened by Amit Wolecki who showed that for each such polygon, the number of pairs of points which do not illuminate each other is finite.

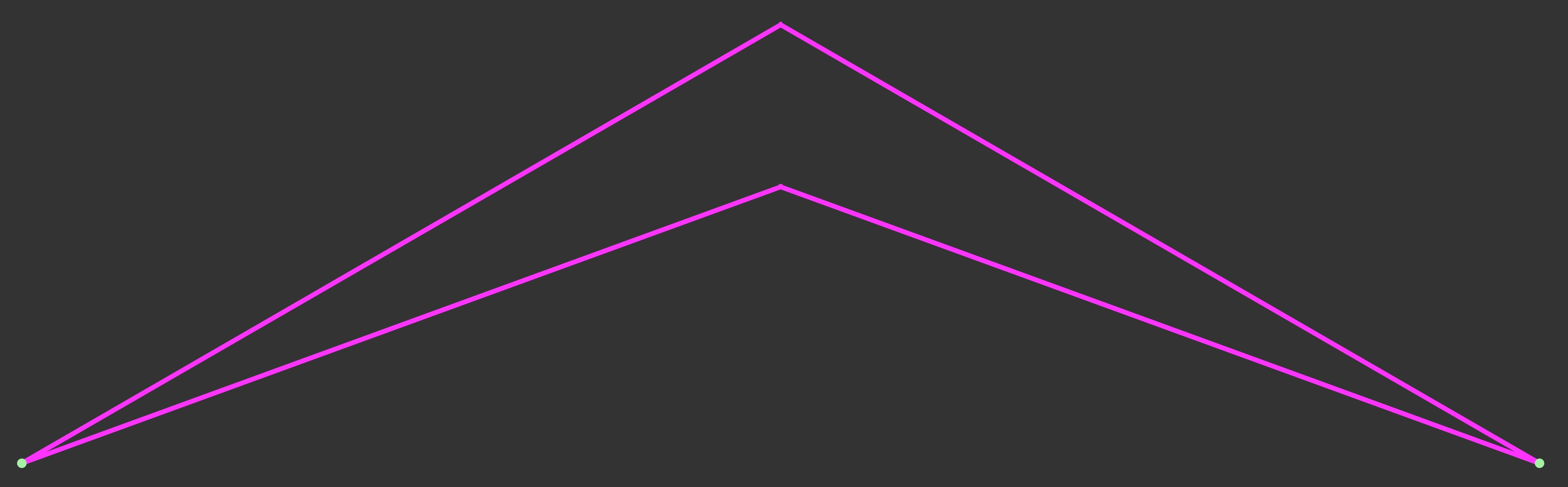
The first polygonal Tokarsky Unilluminable room with 4 sides, 1995. A video showing the path of a billiard ball in this room.

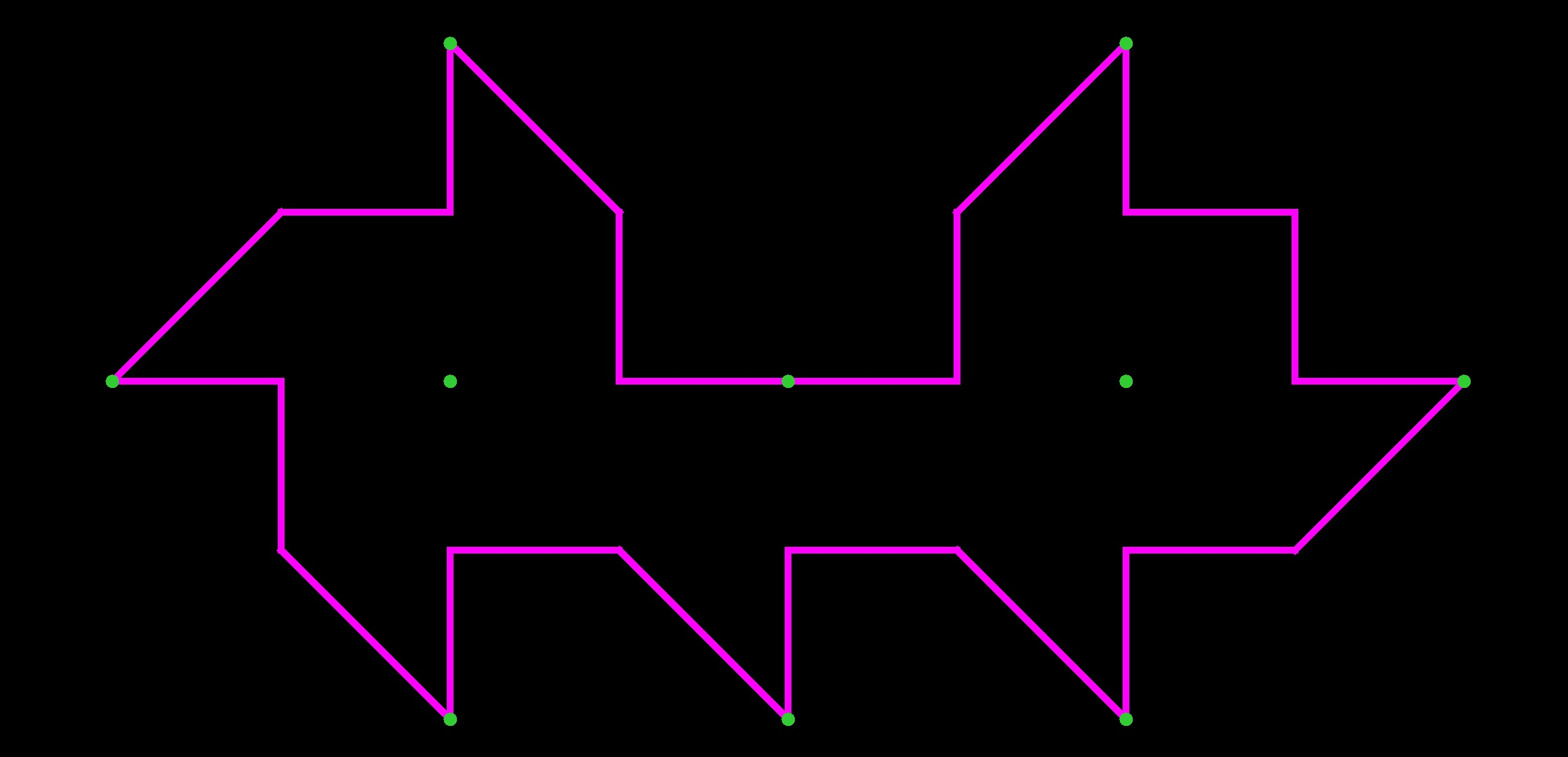
The Original Tokarsky Unilluminable Room with 24 sides, 1995. A video showing the path of a billiard ball in this room.

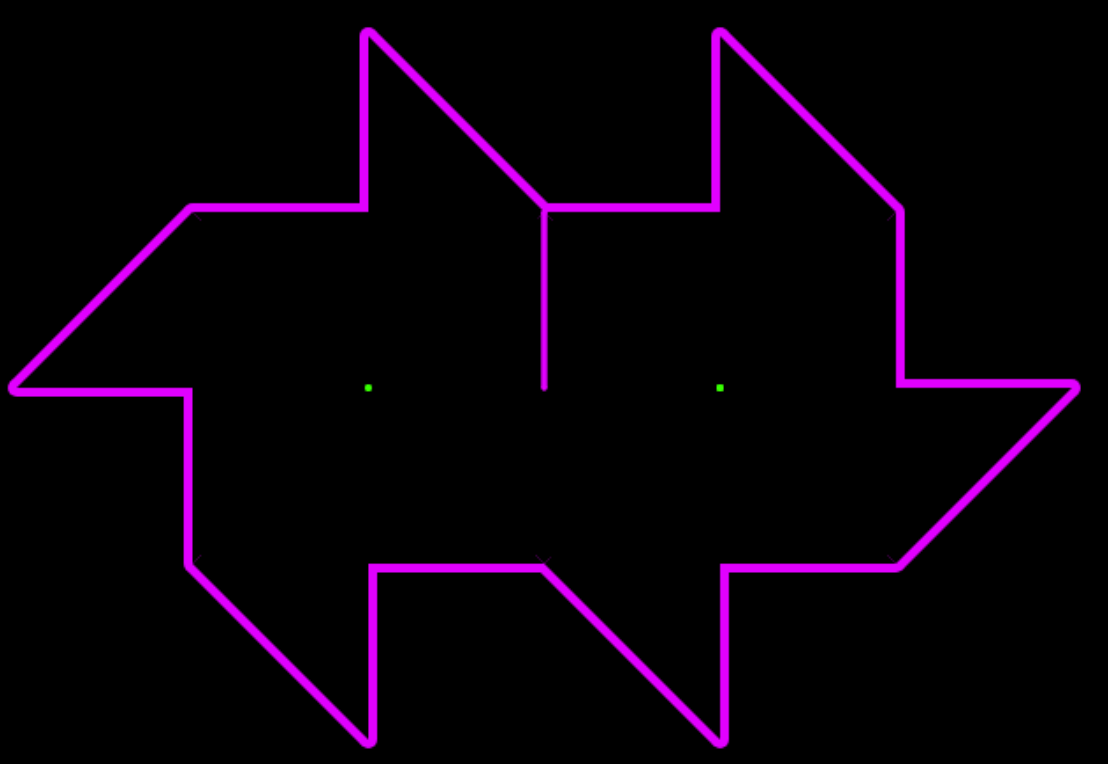
An Unilluminable room with 20 sides, 1996. A video showing the path of a billiard ball in this room.

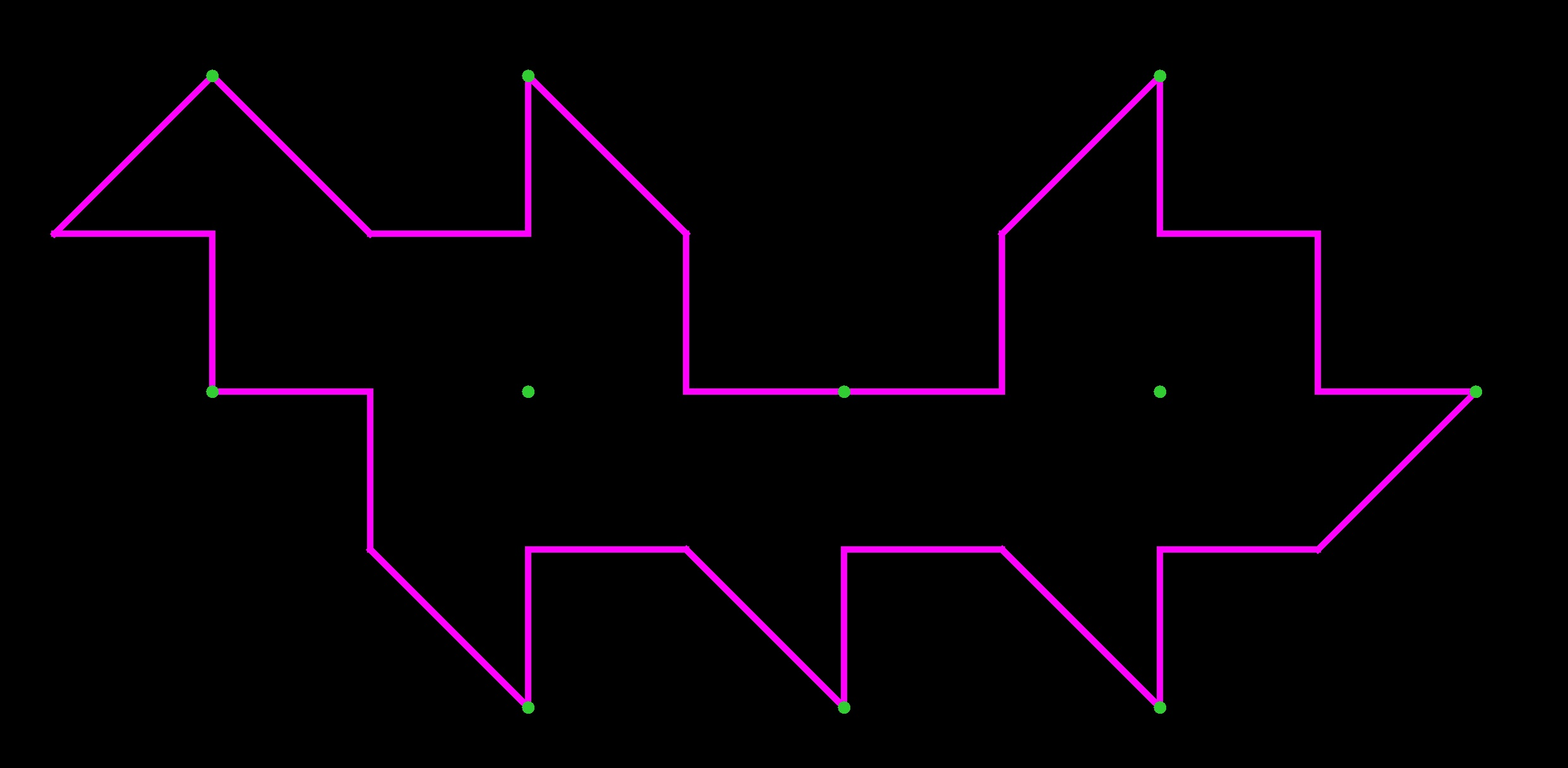
An Odd Sided Tokarsky Unilluminable Room with 27 sides, 1996. A video showing the path of a billiard ball in this room.

== See also ==
- Hadwiger conjecture (alternate formulation with illumination)
