= Roger Penrose =

English mathematical physicist (born 1931)

Sir Roger Penrose OM FRS
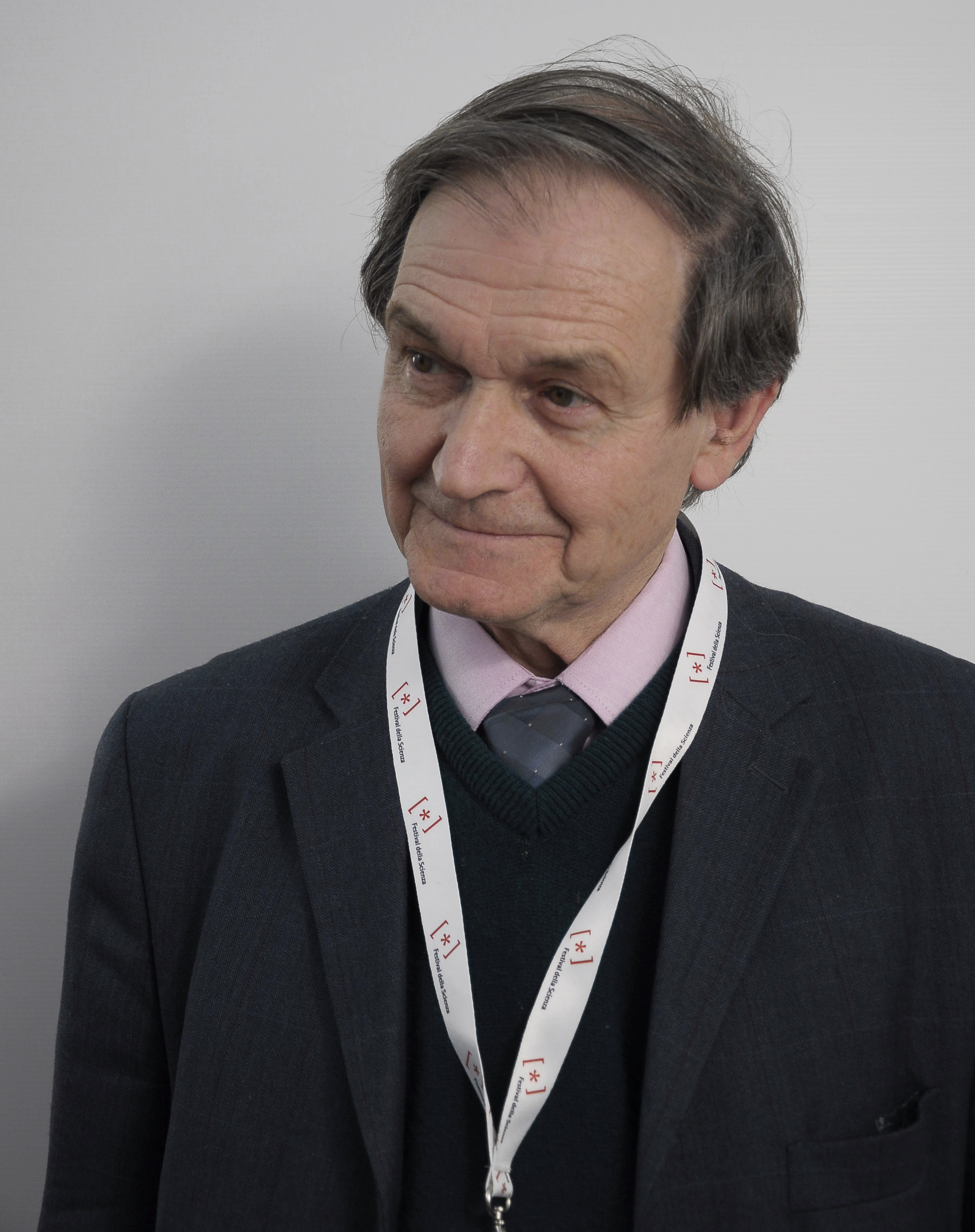
- Penrose in 2011
- Born: 8 August 1931 (age 95); Colchester, Essex, England
- Education: University College London (BSc); St John's College, Cambridge (PhD)
- Known for: List of contributions: Moore–Penrose inverse; Twistor theory; Spin network; Abstract index notation; Black hole bomb; Geometry of spacetime; Cosmic censorship; Illumination problem; Weyl curvature hypothesis; Penrose inequalities; Penrose interpretation of quantum mechanics; Diósi–Penrose model; Newman–Penrose formalism; GHP formalism; Penrose diagram; Penrose inequality; Penrose process; Penrose tiling; Penrose triangle; Penrose stairs; Penrose–Hawking singularity theorems; Penrose graphical notation; Penrose transform; Penrose–Terrell effect; pp-wave spacetime; Schrödinger–Newton equations; Orch-OR/Penrose–Lucas argument; FELIX experiment; Trapped surface; Andromeda paradox; Conformal cyclic cosmology
- Spouses: Joan Isabel Wedge (m. 1959, divorced) Vanessa Thomas (m. 1988)
- Children: 4
- Father: Lionel Penrose
- Relatives: Roland Penrose (uncle), Jonathan Penrose (brother), Oliver Penrose (brother), Shirley Hodgson (sister), Antony Penrose (cousin)
- Awards: List of awards: Adams Prize (1966); Heineman Prize (1971); Fellow of the Royal Society (1972); Eddington Medal (1975); Royal Medal (1985); Wolf Prize (1988); Dirac Medal (IOP) (1989); Albert Einstein Medal (1990); Naylor Prize and Lectureship (1991); Knight Bachelor (1994); James Scott Prize Lectureship (1997–2000); Karl Schwarzschild Medal (2000); De Morgan Medal (2004); Dalton Medal (2005); Copley Medal (2008); Fonseca Prize (2011); Nobel Prize in Physics (2020)
- Scientific career
- Fields: Mathematical physics, tessellations
- Workplaces: Cornell University; Bedford College, London; Princeton University; Rice University; Syracuse University; King's College, London; Birkbeck, University of London; Wadham College, Oxford; Polish Academy of Sciences
- Thesis: Tensor Methods in Algebraic Geometry (1957)
- Doctoral advisor: John A. Todd
- Other academic advisors: W. V. D. Hodge
- Doctoral students: Andrew Hodges; Lane Hughston; Richard Jozsa; Claude LeBrun; John McNamara; Tristan Needham; Tim Poston; Asghar Qadir; Richard S. Ward

Sir Roger Penrose (born 8 August 1931) is an English mathematical physicist. He is Emeritus Rouse Ball Professor of Mathematics at the University of Oxford, an emeritus fellow of Wadham College, Oxford, and an honorary fellow of St John's College, Cambridge, and University College London. He shared the 1988 Wolf Prize in Physics with Stephen Hawking for the Penrose–Hawking singularity theorems, and the 2020 Nobel Prize in Physics "for the discovery that black hole formation is a robust prediction of the general theory of relativity". (Note: The 2020 Nobel Prize was also awarded jointly to Reinhard Genzel and Andrea Ghez "for the discovery of a supermassive compact object at the centre of our galaxy".) He proposed the Penrose triangle and corresponded with M. C. Escher, influencing his Waterfall and Ascending and Descending. Penrose's eponymous aperiodic tiling presaged Dan Shechtman's discovery of quasicrystals.

Penrose won the Royal Society Science Book Prize for The Emperor's New Mind (1989), which outlines his views on physics and consciousness. He expanded on these ideas in Shadows of the Mind (1994) and The Large, the Small and the Human Mind (1997), the latter written with Stuart Hameroff. His The Road to Reality, (2004), billed as "A Complete Guide to the Laws of the Universe", is an overview of mathematical physics.

== Early life and education ==
Born in Colchester, Essex, Roger Penrose is a son of Margaret (née Leathes), a physician, and Lionel Penrose, a psychiatrist and geneticist. His paternal grandparents were J. Doyle Penrose, an Irish-born painter, and the Hon. Elizabeth Josephine Peckover, daughter of Alexander Peckover, 1st Baron Peckover; his maternal grandparents were John Beresford Leathes, a physiologist, and Sonia Marie Natanson, a concert pianist. His uncle was the artist Sir Roland Penrose, whose son with the American photographer Lee Miller is Antony Penrose. Penrose is the brother of the physicist Oliver Penrose, of the geneticist Shirley Hodgson and of the chess grandmaster Jonathan Penrose. Their stepfather was the mathematician and computer scientist Max Newman. He found inspiration in George Gamow's Mr. Tompkins books: "I remember reading (or being read) the Tompkins stories as a quite young child, and I'm sure that their magic was responsible, to a very considerable extent, for the great excitement that fundamental physics has held for me for the rest of my life."

Penrose spent the Second World War in Canada where his father worked in London, Ontario, at the Ontario Hospital and Western University. Penrose studied at University College School. He then attended University College London, where he obtained a BSc degree with First Class Honours in mathematics in 1952.

In 1955, Penrose reintroduced the E. H. Moore generalised matrix inverse, also known as the Moore–Penrose inverse, after it had been reinvented by Arne Bjerhammar in 1951. Having started research under the professor of geometry and astronomy W. V. D. Hodge, Penrose received his PhD in algebraic geometry at St John's College, Cambridge, in 1957, with his thesis "Tensor Methods in Algebraic Geometry" supervised by the algebraist and geometer John A. Todd. He devised and popularised the Penrose triangle in collaboration with his father, describing it as "impossibility in its purest form". He corresponded with the artist M. C. Escher, whose earlier depictions of impossible objects partly inspired it. Escher's Waterfall and Ascending and Descending were in turn inspired by Penrose.

The Penrose triangle

As Manjit Kumar puts it:

As a student in 1954, Penrose was attending a conference in Amsterdam when by chance he came across an exhibition of Escher's work. Soon he was trying to conjure up impossible figures of his own and discovered the tribar – a triangle that looks like a real, solid three-dimensional object, but isn't. Together with his father, a physicist and mathematician, Penrose went on to design a staircase that simultaneously loops up and down. An article followed and a copy was sent to Escher. Completing a cyclical flow of creativity, the Dutch master of geometrical illusions was inspired to produce his two masterpieces.

Penrose later presented the documentary The Art of the Impossible: M. C. Escher and Me.

== Research and career ==
Penrose spent the academic year 1956–57 as an assistant lecturer at Bedford College (now Royal Holloway, University of London) and was a research fellow at St John's College, Cambridge. Before the fellowship ended Penrose won a NATO Research Fellowship for 1959–61, first at Princeton University and then at Syracuse University. Returning to the University of London, Penrose spent 1961–1963 as a researcher at King's College, London, before returning to the United States to spend 1963–64 as a visiting associate professor at the University of Texas at Austin. He later held visiting positions at Yeshiva University, Princeton and Cornell University during 1966–67 and 1969.

Dennis Sciama drew his attention from mathematics to physics. In 1964, while a reader at Birkbeck College, Penrose, per Kip Thorne, "revolutionised the mathematical tools that we use to analyse the properties of spacetime". Until then, work on the curved geometry of general relativity had been confined to configurations with sufficiently high symmetry for Einstein's equations to be solvable explicitly, and there was doubt about whether such cases were typical. One approach to this issue was by the use of perturbation theory, as developed under the leadership of John Archibald Wheeler at Princeton. The other, and more radically innovative, approach initiated by Penrose was to overlook the detailed geometrical structure of spacetime and instead concentrate attention just on the topology of the space, or at most its conformal structure, since it is the latter – as determined by the lay of the lightcones – that determines the trajectories of lightlike geodesics, and hence their causal relationships. The importance of Penrose's paper "Gravitational Collapse and Space-Time Singularities" (summarised roughly as that if an object such as a dying star implodes beyond a certain point, then nothing can prevent the gravitational field getting so strong as to form a singularity) was not its only result. It also showed a way to obtain similarly general conclusions in other contexts, notably that of the cosmological Big Bang, which he dealt with in collaboration with Sciama's student Stephen Hawking.

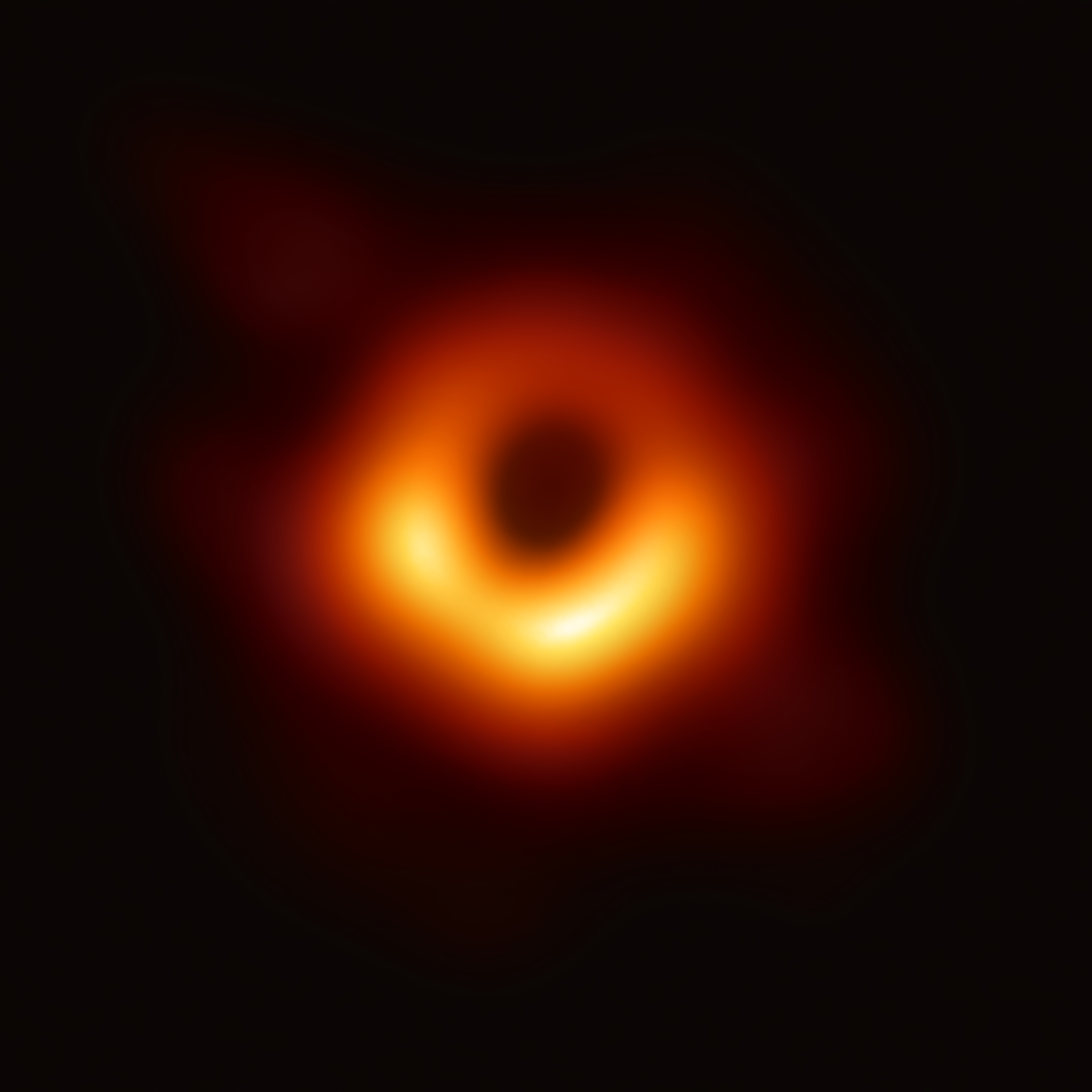
An image of the core region of Messier 87, a supermassive black hole, processed from an array of eight radio telescopes known as the EHT with colours indicating brightness temperature

In 1969, he proposed his cosmic censorship conjecture, that any ensuing singularities would be confined within a well-behaved event horizon surrounding a black hole, leaving a visible exterior region with strong but finite curvature. The paper also suggested that gravitational energy may be extractable by what is now known as the Penrose process; he followed up that suggestion with more details in 1971. In 1979, he formulated the "strong censorship hypothesis".

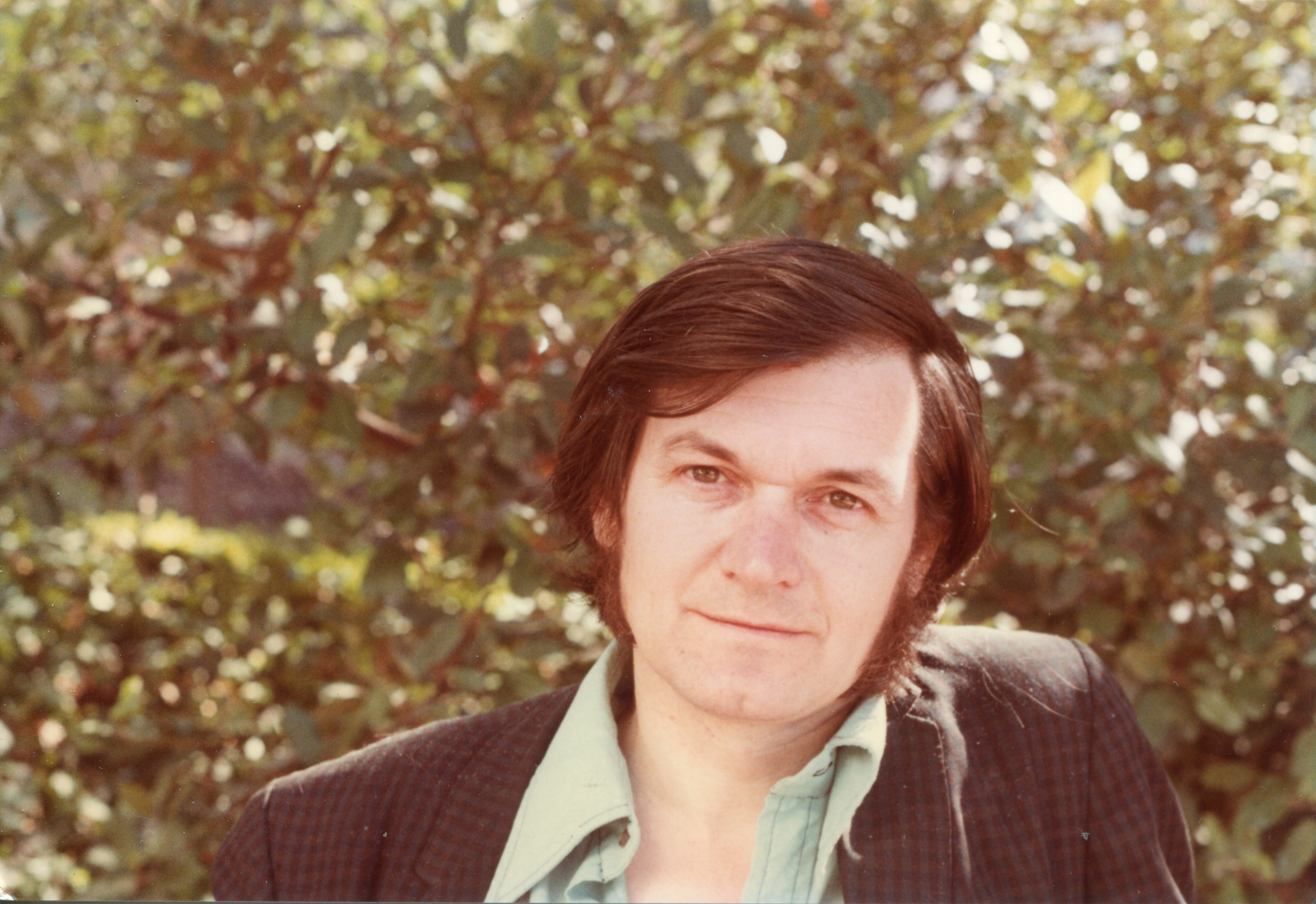
Penrose in 1978

Together with the Belinski–Khalatnikov–Lifshitz conjecture and issues of nonlinear stability, settling the censorship conjectures is one of the most important outstanding problems in general relativity. That year, Penrose formulated his influential Weyl curvature hypothesis on the initial conditions of the observable universe and the origin of the second law of thermodynamics. Penrose and James Terrell independently realised that objects travelling near the speed of light will appear to undergo a peculiar skewing or rotation. This effect has come to be called the Terrell rotation or Penrose–Terrell rotation.

A Penrose tiling

In 1967, Penrose developed twistor theory, which maps geometric objects in Minkowski space into the 4-dimensional complex space with the metric signature (2,2).

In 1971, he discovered spin networks, which later came to form the geometry of spacetime in loop quantum gravity. In 1974, Penrose discovered Penrose tilings, which are formed from two tiles that can only tile the plane nonperiodically, and are the first tilings to exhibit fivefold rotational symmetry. In 1984 such patterns were observed in the arrangement of atoms in quasicrystals. He was influential in popularising what are commonly known as Penrose diagrams (causal diagrams).

In 1983, Penrose was invited to teach at Rice University in Houston, by the then provost Bill Gordon. He worked there until 1987. His doctoral students have included Andrew Hodges, Lane Hughston, Richard Jozsa, Claude LeBrun, John McNamara, Tristan Needham, Tim Poston, Asghar Qadir and Richard S. Ward.

Penrose published The Road to Reality: A Complete Guide to the Laws of the Universe (2004), a guide to the Laws of Physics from Euclid's axioms to Penrose's own theories. The Penrose Interpretation predicts the relationship between quantum mechanics and general relativity, and proposes that a quantum state remains in superposition until the difference of space-time curvature attains a significant level.

Penrose is the Francis and Helen Pentz Distinguished Visiting professor of Physics and Mathematics at Pennsylvania State University.

=== Conformal cyclic cosmology ===
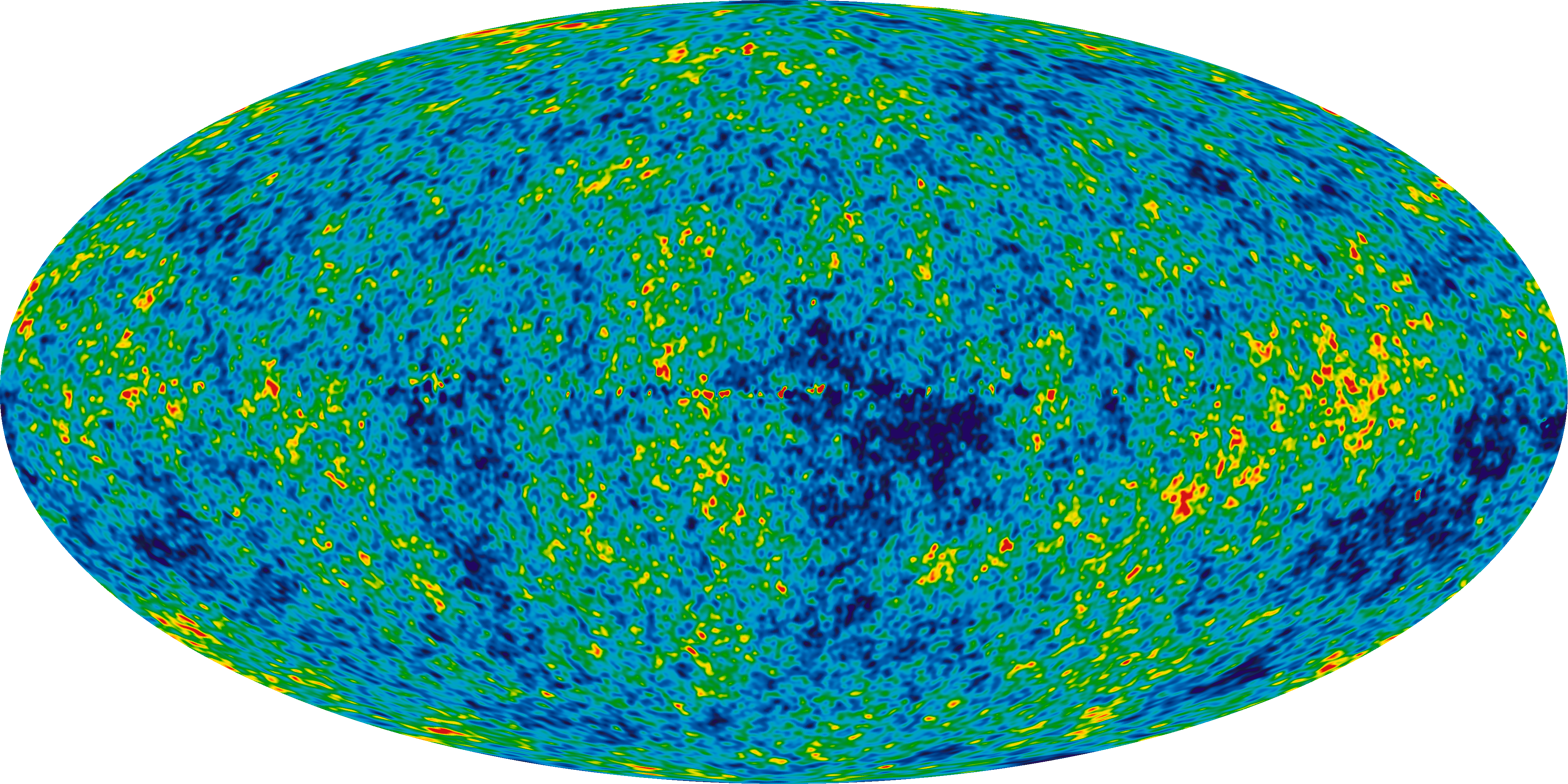
WMAP image of the (extremely tiny) anisotropies in the cosmic background radiation

In 2010 Penrose reported possible evidence, based on concentric circles found in Wilkinson Microwave Anisotropy Probe data of the cosmic microwave background sky, of an earlier universe existing before the Big Bang of the present universe. He mentions this evidence in the epilogue of Cycles of Time (2010), a book in which he presents his reasons, to do with Einstein's field equations, the Weyl curvature C, and the Weyl curvature hypothesis (WCH), that the transition at the Big Bang could have been smooth enough for a previous universe to survive it. He made several conjectures about C and the WCH, some of which were subsequently proved by others, and he also popularized conformal cyclic cosmology (CCC). Penrose postulates that at the end of the universe all matter is eventually contained within black holes, which subsequently evaporate via Hawking radiation. At this point, everything contained within the universe consists of photons, which "experience" neither time nor space. There is essentially no difference between an infinitely large universe consisting only of photons and an infinitely small universe consisting only of photons. Therefore, a singularity for a Big Bang and an infinitely expanded universe are equivalent.

Penrose believes that the singularity in Einstein's field equation at the Big Bang is only an apparent singularity, similar to the well-known apparent singularity at the event horizon of a black hole. The latter singularity can be removed by a change of coordinate system, and Penrose proposes a different change of coordinate system that will remove the singularity at the big bang. One implication of this is that the major events at the Big Bang can be understood without unifying general relativity and quantum mechanics, and therefore we are not necessarily constrained by the Wheeler–DeWitt equation, which disrupts time. Alternatively, one can use the Einstein–Maxwell–Dirac equations.

=== Consciousness ===
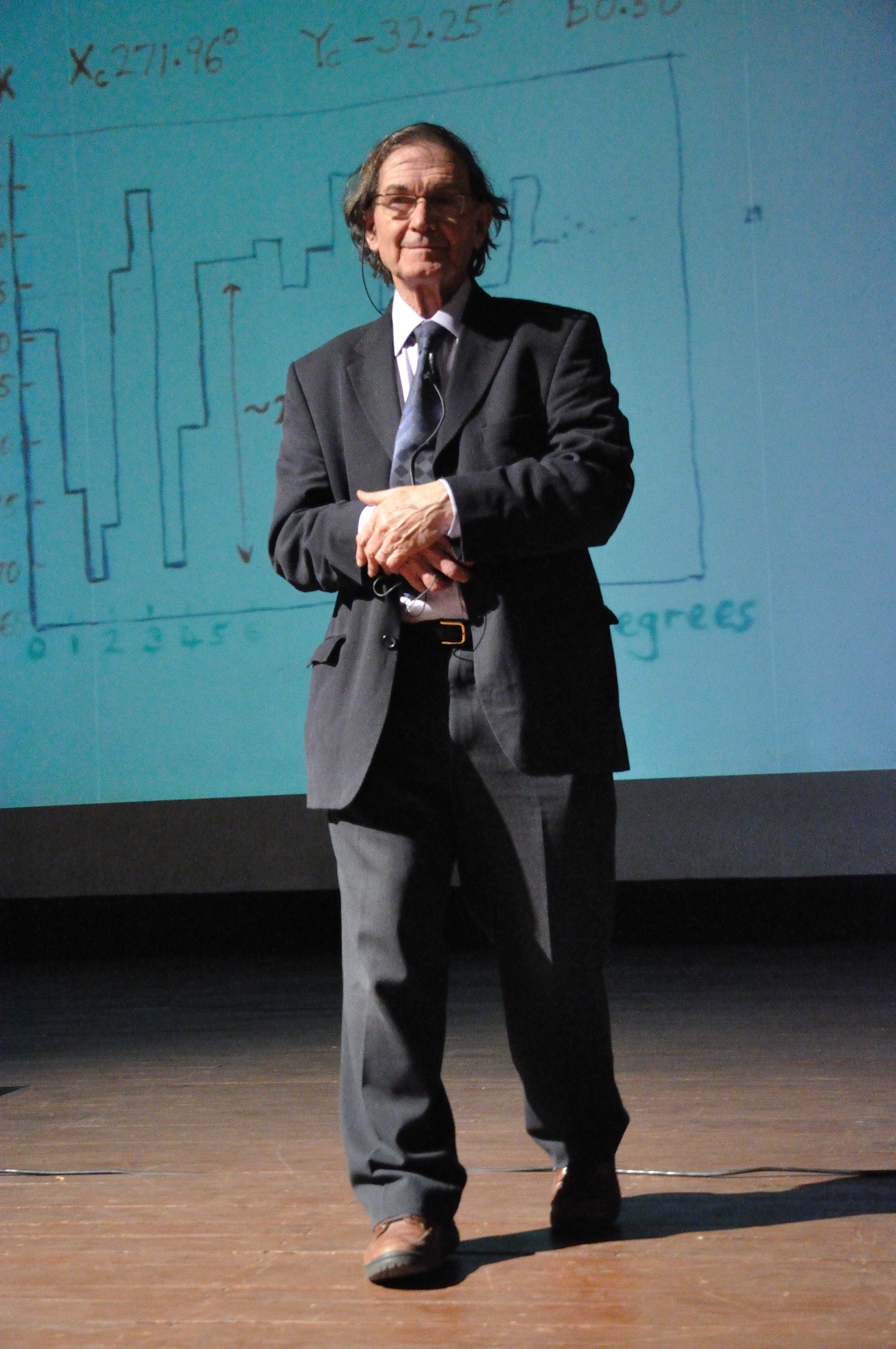
Penrose at a conference c. 2011

Penrose has written on the connection between physics and consciousness. In The Emperor's New Mind (1989), he argues that known laws of physics are inadequate to explain consciousness. Penrose proposes the characteristics this new physics may have and specifies the requirements for a bridge between classical and quantum mechanics (what he calls correct quantum gravity). Penrose uses a variant of Turing's halting theorem to demonstrate that a system can be deterministic without being algorithmic. (For example, imagine a system with only two states, ON and OFF. If the system's state is ON when a given Turing machine halts and OFF when the Turing machine does not halt, then the system's state is completely determined by the machine; nevertheless, there is no algorithmic way to determine whether the Turing machine stops.)

Penrose believes that such deterministic yet non-algorithmic processes may come into play in the quantum mechanical wave function reduction, and may be harnessed by the brain. He argues that computers today are unable to have intelligence because they are algorithmically deterministic systems. He argues against the viewpoint that the rational processes of the mind are completely algorithmic and can thus be duplicated by a sufficiently complex computer. This contrasts with supporters of strong artificial intelligence, who contend that thought can be simulated algorithmically. He bases this on claims that consciousness transcends formal logic because factors such as the insolubility of the halting problem and Gödel's incompleteness theorem prevent an algorithmically based system of logic from reproducing such traits of human intelligence as mathematical insight. These claims were originally espoused by the philosopher John Lucas of Merton College, Oxford.

The Penrose–Lucas argument about the implications of Gödel's incompleteness theorem for computational theories of human intelligence has been criticised by mathematicians, computer scientists and philosophers. Many experts in these fields assert that Penrose's argument fails, though different authors choose different aspects of the argument to attack. Marvin Minsky, a proponent of artificial intelligence, was particularly critical, writing that Penrose "tries to show, in chapter after chapter, that human thought cannot be based on any known scientific principle." Minsky's position is exactly the opposite – he believed that humans are, in fact, machines, whose functioning, although complex, is fully explainable by current physics. Minsky maintained that "one can carry that quest [for scientific explanation] too far by only seeking new basic principles instead of attacking the real detail. This is what I see in Penrose's quest for a new basic principle of physics that will account for consciousness."

Penrose responded to criticism of The Emperor's New Mind with Shadows of the Mind (1994) and The Large, the Small and the Human Mind (1997). In those works, he also combined his observations with those of anesthesiologist Stuart Hameroff.

Penrose and Hameroff have argued that consciousness is the result of quantum gravity effects in microtubules, which they dubbed Orch-OR (orchestrated objective reduction). Max Tegmark, in a paper in Physical Review E, calculated that the time scale of neuron firing and excitations in microtubules is slower than the decoherence time by a factor of at least 10 billion. The paper's reception is summed up by this statement in Tegmark's support: "Physicists outside the fray, such as IBM's John A. Smolin, say the calculations confirm what they had suspected all along. 'We're not working with a brain that's near absolute zero. It's reasonably unlikely that the brain evolved quantum behavior'". Tegmark's paper has been widely cited by critics of the Penrose–Hameroff position.

Phillip Tetlow, although himself supportive of Penrose's views, acknowledges that Penrose's ideas about the human thought process are a minority view in scientific circles, citing Minsky's criticisms and quoting Charles Seife's description of Penrose as "one of a handful of scientists" who believe that the nature of consciousness suggests a quantum process.

In January 2014 Hameroff and Penrose ventured that a discovery of quantum vibrations in microtubules by Anirban Bandyopadhyay of the National Institute for Materials Science in Japan supports the hypothesis of Orch-OR theory. A reviewed and updated version of the theory was published along with critical commentary and debate in the March 2014 issue of Physics of Life Reviews.

He and Ted Honderich discussied consciousness on In Our Time.

== Personal life ==
Penrose married Joan Isabel Penrose (née Wedge) in 1959. They had three sons. Penrose is now married to Vanessa Thomas, director of Academic Development at Cokethorpe School in Witney, Oxfordshire, and former head of mathematics at Abingdon School. They have one son. Penrose is a devotee of Johann Sebastian Bach. On Desert Island Discs, he chose four works by Bach, and his first choice was the Mass in B minor.

=== Beliefs ===
Penrose is a mathematical Platonist, believing that mathematics has a "prior ethereal existence". As evidence, he points to the Mandelbrot set: "Whichever mathematician or computer buff chooses to explore the set, approximations to the same fundamental mathematical structure will be found... The computer is being used in essentially the same way that the experimental physicist uses a piece of experimental apparatus to explore the structure of the physical world. The Mandelbrot set is not an invention of the human mind, it was a discovery. Like Mount Everest, the Mandelbrot set is just there!"

Penrose stated, "I don't believe in established religions of any kind." He regards himself as an agnostic. In Errol Morris's A Brief History of Time (1991) he said, "I think I would say that the universe has a purpose, it's not somehow just there by chance ... some people, I think, take the view that the universe is just there and it runs along—it's a bit like it just sort of computes, and we happen somehow by accident to find ourselves in this thing. But I don't think that's a very fruitful or helpful way of looking at the universe, I think that there is something much deeper about it."

Regarding consciousness, he says "There is something going on which might resonate with a religious perspective. ... The presence of consciousness is not an accident. It certainly has connections with a view that people often have, that you have these constants of Nature, and nobody knows where they come from, and if they didn't have the particular values that they have, we wouldn't have interesting chemistry, we wouldn't have life."

Penrose is a patron of Humanists UK.

== Publications ==
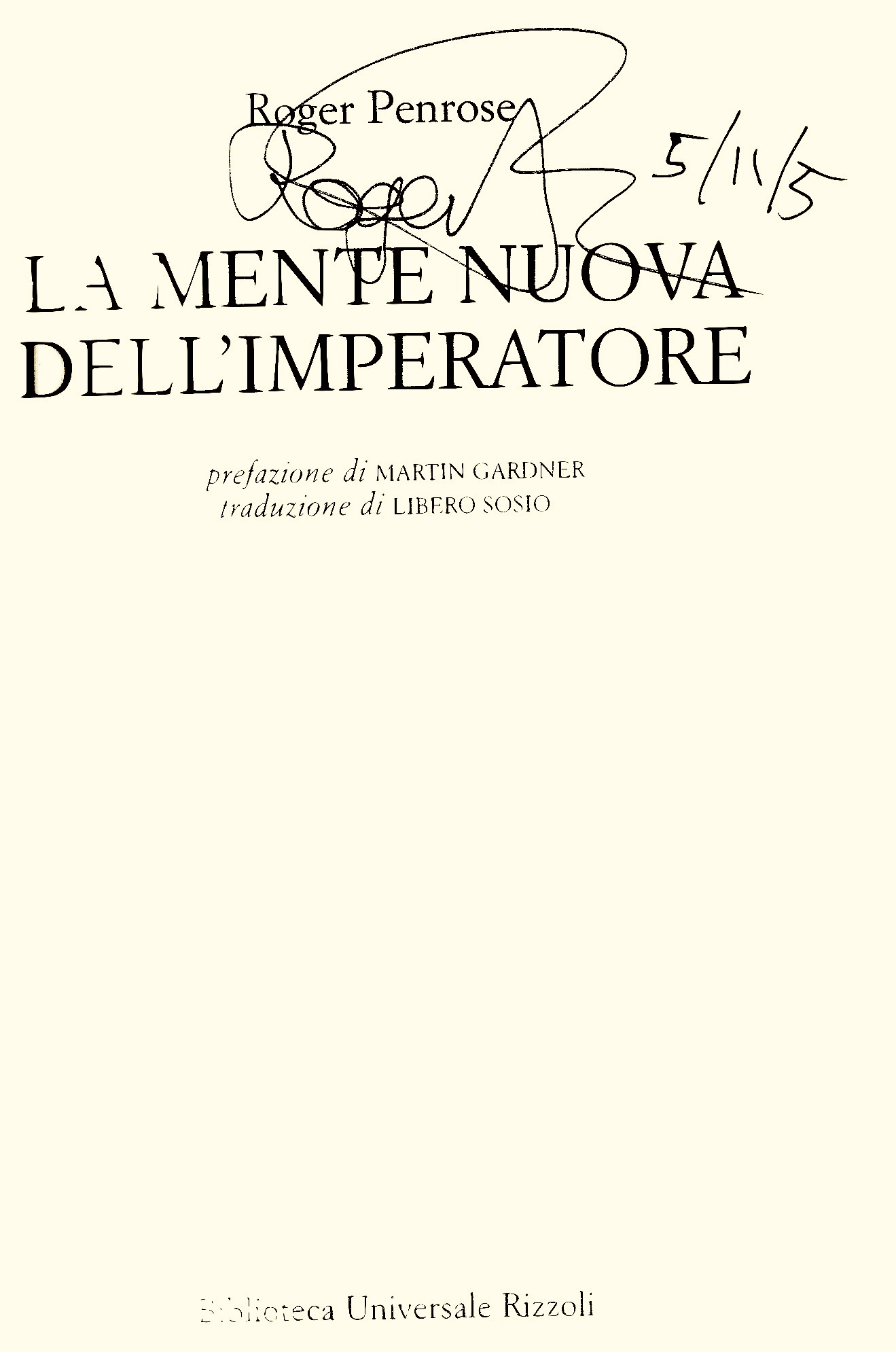
A copy of The Emperor's New Mind Italian edition signed by Penrose, 2005

In 2010, Oxford University Press published Penroses's Collected works volumes 1 through 6, with over 5000 pages spanning 50 years.

=== Penrose's popular publications ===
- The Emperor's New Mind: Concerning Computers, Minds, and The Laws of Physics (1989)
- Shadows of the Mind: A Search for the Missing Science of Consciousness (1994)
- The Road to Reality: A Complete Guide to the Laws of the Universe (2004)
- Cycles of Time: An Extraordinary New View of the Universe (2010)
- Fashion, Faith, and Fantasy in the New Physics of the Universe (2016)

=== Co-authored works ===
- The Nature of Space and Time (with Stephen Hawking) (1996)
- The Large, the Small and the Human Mind (with Abner Shimony, Nancy Cartwright and Stephen Hawking) (1997)
- White Mars: The Mind Set Free (with Brian Aldiss) (1999)

=== Academic books ===
- Techniques of Differential Topology in Relativity (1972, ISBN 0-89871-005-7)
- Spinors and Space-Time: Volume 1, Two-Spinor Calculus and Relativistic Fields (with Wolfgang Rindler, 1987) ISBN 0-521-33707-0 (paperback)
- Spinors and Space-Time: Volume 2, Spinor and Twistor Methods in Space-Time Geometry (with Wolfgang Rindler, 1988) (reprint), ISBN 0-521-34786-6 (paperback)

=== Forewords ===
- The Map and the Territory: Exploring the foundations of science, thought and reality by Shyam Wuppuluri and Francisco Antonio Doria. Published by Springer in "The Frontiers Collection", 2018.
- Beating the Odds: The Life and Times of E. A. Milne by Meg Weston Smith. Published by World Scientific Publishing Co in June 2013.
- A Computable Universe by Hector Zenil. Published by World Scientific Publishing Co in December 2012.
- Quantum Aspects of Life by Derek Abbott, Paul C. W. Davies and Arun K. Pati. Published by Imperial College Press in 2008.
- Fearful Symmetry by Anthony Zee. Published by Princeton University Press in 2007.

== Awards and honours ==
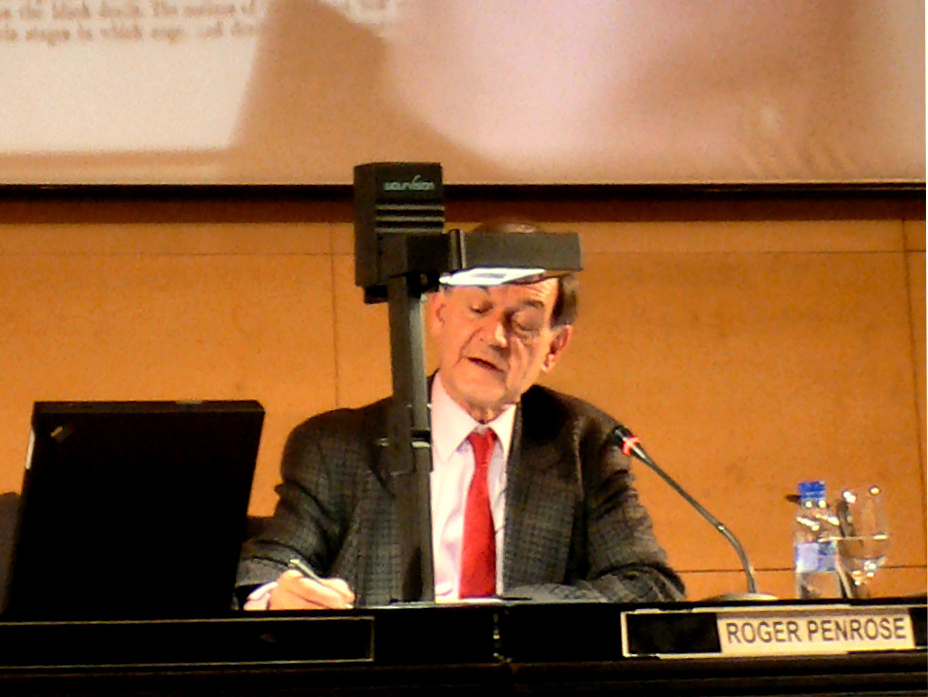
Penrose during a lecture

- 1971 Dannie Heineman Prize for Astrophysics by the American Astronomical Society and American Institute of Physics.
- 1972 Fellow of the Royal Society (FRS).
- 1975 Hawking and Penrose were jointly awarded the Eddington Medal of the Royal Astronomical Society.
- 1985 Royal Society Royal Medal.
- 1988 Wolf Prize in Physics by the Wolf Foundation (Israel) with Hawking .
- 1989 Dirac Medal of the British Institute of Physics. Honorary Fellow of the Institute of Physics (HonFInstP). Royal Society Science Book Prize for The Emperor's New Mind
- 1990 Albert Einstein Medal for outstanding work related to the work of Albert Einstein by the Albert Einstein Society (Switzerland).
- 1991 Naylor Prize of the London Mathematical Society.
- 1992 Doctor of Science degree (DSc) from the University of New Brunswick
- 1993 honorary degree from the University of Surrey.
- 1994 Knighthood for services to science. DSc by the University of Bath. Member of the Polish Academy of Sciences.
- 1995 Honorary degree from the University of London
- 1996 Honorary degrees from the University of Glasgow and University of Essex.
- 1997 - 2000 James Scott Prize Lectureship
- 1998 Foreign Associate of the United States National Academy of Sciences. Honary degrees from Open University (Doctor of the University, DUniv).
- 2000 Member of the Order of Merit (OM).
- 2002 honorary doctorate from the University of Southampton.
- 2004 honorary DSc from the University of Waterloo (Ontario, Canada); the De Morgan Medal by the London Mathematical Society for his wide and original contributions to mathematical physics. To quote the citation from the society:

His deep work on General Relativity has been a major factor in our understanding of black holes. His development of Twistor Theory has produced a beautiful and productive approach to the classical equations of mathematical physics. His tilings of the plane underlie the newly discovered quasi-crystals.

- 2005 Doctorate Honoris Causa (Dr.h.c.) from each the Warsaw University (Poland) and the Katholieke Universiteit Leuven (Belgium), and an honorary Doctor of Philosophy (PhD) degree from the Athens University of Economics and Business (Greece). Manchester Literary and Philosophical Society Dalton Medal.
- 2006 honorary Doctor of the University (DUniv) by the University of York and the Dirac Medal given by the University of New South Wales (Australia).
- 2008 Copley Medal of the Royal Society
- 2011 Member of the American Philosophical Society. Fonseca Prize by the University of Santiago de Compostela
- 2012 Richard R. Ernst Medal by ETH Zürich for his contributions to science and strengthening the connection between science and society, the honorary DSc by the Trinity College Dublin (Ireland) and an honorary doctorate degree by the Igor Sikorsky Kyiv Polytechnic Institute (Ukraine).
- 2015, Dr.h.c. by CINVESTAV (Mexico).
- 2017 Commandino Medal at the Urbino University (Italy) for his contributions to the history of science; DSc by the University of Edinburgh.
- 2018 honorary degree from King's College London.
- 2019 Member of the Academia Europaea (MAE)
- 2020 Nobel Prize in Physics by the Royal Swedish Academy of Sciences "for the discovery that black hole formation is a robust prediction of the general theory of relativity", a half-share also going to Reinhard Genzel and Andrea Ghez "for the discovery of a supermassive compact object at the centre of our galaxy." (DSc) by the University of Cambridge.
- 2025 Golden Plate Award of the American Academy of Achievement.

== See also ==
- List of things named after Roger Penrose
