= GHP formalism =

Technique in numerical relativity

The GHP formalism (or Geroch–Held–Penrose formalism), also known as the compacted spin-coefficient formalism, is a technique used in the mathematics of general relativity that involves singling out a pair of null directions at each point of spacetime. It is a rewriting of the Newman–Penrose formalism which respects the covariance of Lorentz transformations preserving two null directions. This is desirable for Petrov Type D spacetimes, including black holes in general relativity, where there is a preferred pair of degenerate principal null directions but no natural additional structure to fully fix a preferred Newman–Penrose (NP) frame.

== Covariance ==
The GHP formalism notices that given a spin-frame $(o^A,\iota^A)$ with $o_A \iota^A = 1,$ the complex rescaling $(o^A,\iota^A)\rightarrow (\lambda o^A, \lambda^{-1} \iota^A )$ does not change normalization. The magnitude of this transformation is a boost, and the phase tells one how much to rotate. A quantity of weight $(p,q)$ is one that transforms like $\eta \rightarrow \lambda^p \bar{\lambda}^q \eta.$ One then defines derivative operators which take tensors under these transformations to tensors. This simplifies many NP equations, and allows one to define scalars on 2-surfaces in a natural way.

== See also ==
- General relativity
- NP formalism
