= R. Adam Engle =

American social entrepreneur (born 1942)

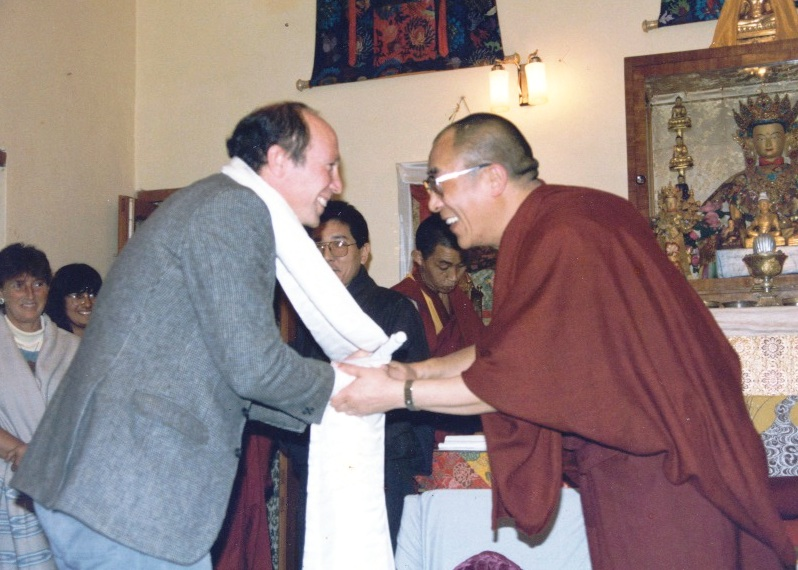
R. Adam Engle receiving ceremonial scarf from the 14th Dalai Lama, Dharamsala, India, 1987

R. Adam Engle (born February 17, 1942, in Yonkers, New York, U.S.) is an American social entrepreneur who initiated and developed the Mind and Life Dialogues between the 14th Dalai Lama of Tibet and panels of prominent scientists in the 1980s. Over the 22 years of his subsequent tenure as chief executive of the Mind and Life Institute, which he co-founded in 1990, his work contributed significantly to the establishment of contemplative science as a new field of research.

== Original concept of Buddhism-science dialogues ==
In 1983, the Harvard educated lawyer Engle, from Boulder, Colorado, came to know of Tenzin Gyatso, the 14th Dalai Lama's interest in modern science and, realizing from his personal Buddhist studies that the concept of a Buddhism-science interface was potentially an important new scientific field to be researched, he contacted the Dalai Lama's office in India offering to arrange a dialogue for him with selected western scientists. The Dalai Lama accepted and authorized Engle to set one up, and Engle arranged the first dialogue to take place between him and five scientists in 1987. Over the next 25 years Engle organized dozens of international conferences between meditators and scientists and oversaw the publication of 11 top-selling books in a successful strategy to establish and popularize the new field of the contemplative sciences.

== Development of Mind and Life Institute ==
The initial meetings in the 1980s were so successful that Engle registered and funded the Mind and Life Institute in 1990 in the US as a not-for-profit 501(c)(3) organization dedicated to exploring the interface between science and Buddhism. His two other co-founders were Tenzin Gyatso, the 14th Dalai Lama of Tibet, who would chair the dialogues, and Francisco Varela, the late Chilean neuroscientist, who until his untimely death in 2001 would coordinate the teams of scientists with relevant specializations for each conference according to its theme.

On the institute's formal establishment in 1990 Engle, as its creator, became its chair and CEO, a post he held for 22 years until his retirement in 2012. By then he had guided its development into "a worldwide and influential organization bringing together the highest standards of modern science and contemplative practice".

== Launch of formal scientific research programs ==
In 1998, to optimize the potential for societal benefits, Engle broadened his institute's initial mission to include carrying out formal scientific research. At the next dialogue in 2000 Engle proposed that a series of scientific investigations should be carried out under laboratory conditions with the aim of establishing whether Buddhist contemplative practices could be of significant benefit to modern society. This proved to be the case and so Engle's next task was to develop ways of teaching the subject in a secular environment. As an outcome of his organization's next dialogue, held at MIT in 2003 and entitled ‘Investigating the Mind’ (the first one to be held as a public event, with an audience of 1,200), Engle took the initial steps to launch the first formal scientific research program on this subject. Participating scientists included Nobel Laureate Daniel Kahneman and Eric Lander, Director of the MIT Center for Genome Research. This conference marked the birth of Contemplative Neuroscience.

In 2004, Engle announced the launch of the annual Summer Research Institute at the Garrison Institute offering a new curriculum on contemplative neuroscience to graduates, postdoctorates and members of the science faculty. He also launched the annual Francisco J. Varela Research Awards, to provide pilot study funding to suitable applicants. In 2005, Engle's second public dialogue was held in Washington DC, 'The Science and Clinical Applications of Meditation', co-sponsored by Johns Hopkins University School of Medicine and Georgetown University Medical Center.

== Establishment of contemplative sciences ==
In 2012 Engle's strategy to establish the new field of contemplative sciences was completed when he initiated an international symposium on contemplative studies in Denver Colorado, with 700 representatives from contemplative science and studies research bodies in attendance.

By the time Engle retired from Mind and Life Institute in 2012 he had directed the organization of 27 international dialogues, both private and public, between the Dalai Lama and other meditators and prominent scientists. To document the discussions and outcomes of the first 13 of these events, by 2012 eleven books (listed below) had been published under his oversight and videos or DVDs had been released covering most of the others.

== Publications produced during tenure ==
While chief executive of Mind and Life Institute, Engle oversaw the publication of the following books to document its work:

- Hayward, Jeremy W.; Varela, Francisco J, eds. (1992) Gentle Bridges: Conversations with the Dalai Lama on the Sciences of Mind, Boston MA., Shambhala Publications. ISBN 1-57062-893-9. [Based on Mind & Life dialogue No.1, 1987]
- Houshmand, Zara; Livingston, Robert B.; Wallace B. Alan, eds. (1999) Consciousness at the Crossroads: Conversations with the Dalai Lama on Brain Science and Buddhism. Ithaca, New York: Snow Lion Publications. ISBN 978-1559391276. [Based on Mind & Life dialogue No.2, 1989]
- Goleman, Daniel, ed. (2003) Healing Emotions: Conversations with the Dalai Lama on Mindfulness, Emotions and Health. Boston MA: Shambala Publications. ISBN 9781590300107. [Based on Mind & Life dialogue No.3, 1990]
- His Holiness the Dalai Lama (author), Varela, Francisco J, ed. (1997) Sleeping, Dreaming, and Dying: An Exploration of Consciousness. Somerville, MA., Wisdom Publications. ISBN 0861711238. [Based on Mind & Life dialogue No.4, 1992]
- Richardson, David, Harrington, Anne; eds. (2002) Visions of Compassion: Western Scientists and Tibetan Buddhists Examine Human Nature, Oxford University Press, New York. ISBN 019513043X. [Based on Mind & Life dialogue No.5, 1995]
- Zajonc, Arthur, ed. (2004) The New Physics and Cosmology: Dialogues with the Dalai Lama. Oxford University Press, New York. ISBN 9780195159943. [Based on Mind & Life dialogue No.6, 1997]
- Goleman, Daniel. (2003) Destructive Emotions: A Scientific Dialogue with the Dalai Lama, New York: Random House, ISBN 0553801716. [Based on Mind & Life dialogue No.8, 2000]
- Luisi, Pier Luigi, Houshmand, Zara. (2009) Discussions with the Dalai Lama on the nature of reality, Columbia University Press, New York. ISBN 0-231-14550-0, ISBN 978-0-231-14550-3. [Based on Mind & Life dialogue No.10, 2002]
- Harrington, Anne; Zajonc, Arthur, eds. (2006) The Dalai Lama at MIT. Harvard University Press. ISBN 0-674-02319-6. [Based on Mind & Life dialogue No.11, 2003]
- Begley, Sharon. (2007) Train Your Mind, Change Your Brain: How a New Science Reveals Our Extraordinary Potential to Transform Ourselves, New York: Ballantine Books. ISBN 978-0-345-47989-1. [Based on Mind & Life dialogue No.12, 2004]
- Kabat-Zinn, Jon; Richardson, David. (2012) The Mind's Own Physician: A Scientific Dialogue with the Dalai Lama on the Healing Power of Meditation, New Harbinger Publications, Oakland CA, ISBN 9781572249684. [Based on Mind & Life dialogue No.13, 2005]

== Education ==
- A.B., Economics, University of Colorado
- J.D., Harvard Law School
- M.B.A., Stanford Graduate School of Business

== Sources ==
- Marcia Barinaga, Studying the Well-Trained Mind, Science, 3 October 2003, Vol. 302 no. 5642 pp. 44–46, doi:10.1126/science.302.5642.44
- Begley, Sharon, Train Your Mind, Change Your Brain: How a New Science Reveals Our Extraordinary Potential to Transform Ourselves, New York: Ballantine Books, 2007. ISBN 978-0-345-47989-1.
- Pier Luigi Luisi, Zara Houshmand, Mind and life: discussions with the Dalai Lama on the nature of reality, Columbia University Press, 2009, ISBN 0-231-14550-0, ISBN 978-0-231-14550-3
- Gay Watson, Beyond happiness: deepening the dialogue between Buddhism, psychotherapy and the mind sciences, Karnac Books, 2008, ISBN 1-85575-404-5, ISBN 978-1-85575-404-1
- B. Alan Wallace, Buddhism & Science: breaking new ground, Columbia University Press, 2003, Appendix: a History of the Mind and Life Institute : pp. 417–421.
