= Barry Kerzin =

American physician and Buddhist monk (born 1947)

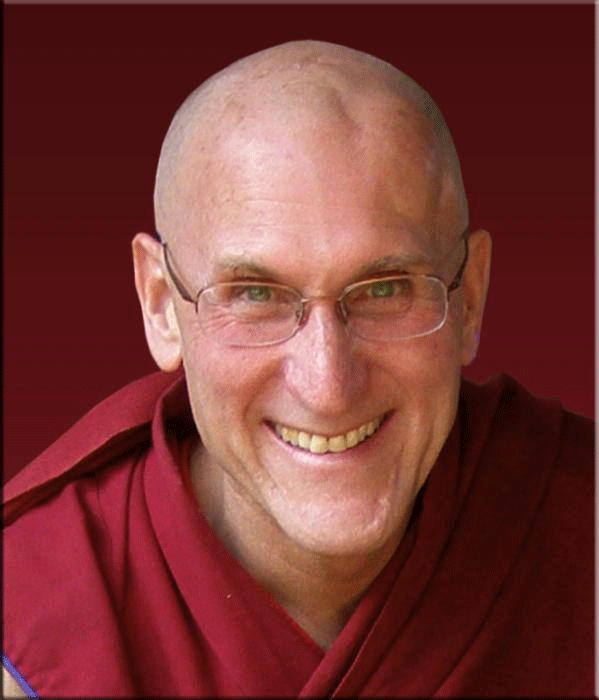
- Born: Barry Michael Kerzin; November 1, 1947 (age 78); Hollywood, California, U.S.
- Education: University of California, Berkeley (BA Philosophy); University of Southern California (MD)
- Occupations: Teacher; physician; Buddhist monk
- Known for: Medical doctor to Dalai Lama
- Medical career
- Institutions: University of Washington School of Medicine

Barry Michael Kerzin (born November 1, 1947) is an American physician and Buddhist monk. He has lived in Dharamshala, India since 1988 and serves as a personal physician to the 14th Dalai Lama, along with treating people in the local community. Following his ordination as a monk by the Dalai Lama in January 2003, he has travelled, teaching workshops in which he blends Buddhist teaching and his medical training. He has served as a research participant in neuroscience research into the effects of meditation on the brain.

Kerzin has been an adjunct professor (2021–22) at the University of Hong Kong (HKU) and a former Assistant Professor of Medicine at the University of Washington. He is founder and president of the Altruism in Medicine Institute (AIMI) and founder and chairman of the Human Values Institute (HVI) in Japan.

== Early life and education ==
Kerzin was born in Hollywood, California in the Good Samaritan Hospital on All Saints day, November 1, 1947. When he read two books: one by D.T. Suzuki, An Introduction to Zen Buddhism, and The Way of Zen, by Alan Watts. He says he had been was plagued by questions of who he was and why he was here; they led him to join a philosophy club in high school and to switch to studying philosophy in college. He chose to continue on to medical school, because at the age of eleven he had a brain abscess that caused him to have seizures and fall into comas; it was eventually treated by a neurosurgeon with four brain surgeries, which inspired him to become a doctor.

Kerzin received BA in Philosophy from the University of California at Berkeley and in 1976 he received an MD degree from the University of Southern California.

== Career ==
Kerzin did his residency at Ventura County Medical Center and practiced family medicine in Ojai, California for seven years. His mother had died when he was 27, and just after he started working in Ojai, his wife was diagnosed with ovarian cancer. She died in 1983 and they had no children. He travelled in India, Sri Lanka, and Nepal for nearly a year, visiting several monasteries. He then obtained an appointment as an Assistant Professor of Medicine at the University of Washington School of Medicine from late 1985 to early 1989.

In the mid-1980s, B. Alan Wallace and the Dharma Friendship Foundation coaxed a lama from Dharamsala, Gen Lamrimpa, to go to Seattle for two years, and Kerzin served as his driver. In 1988, Lamrimpa returned to India and Kerzin accompanied him, intending to take a six-month leave of absence from the University of Washington. He stayed in Dharamsala when his leave ended, and began providing free medical care to the local community, Dalai Lama and other Tibetan lamas. He also began studying Buddhism and meditation, and he was ordained in February 2003 as a Bikkshu (Buddhist monk) by Dalai Lama. Kerzin has maintained his board certification with the American Board of Family Medicine.

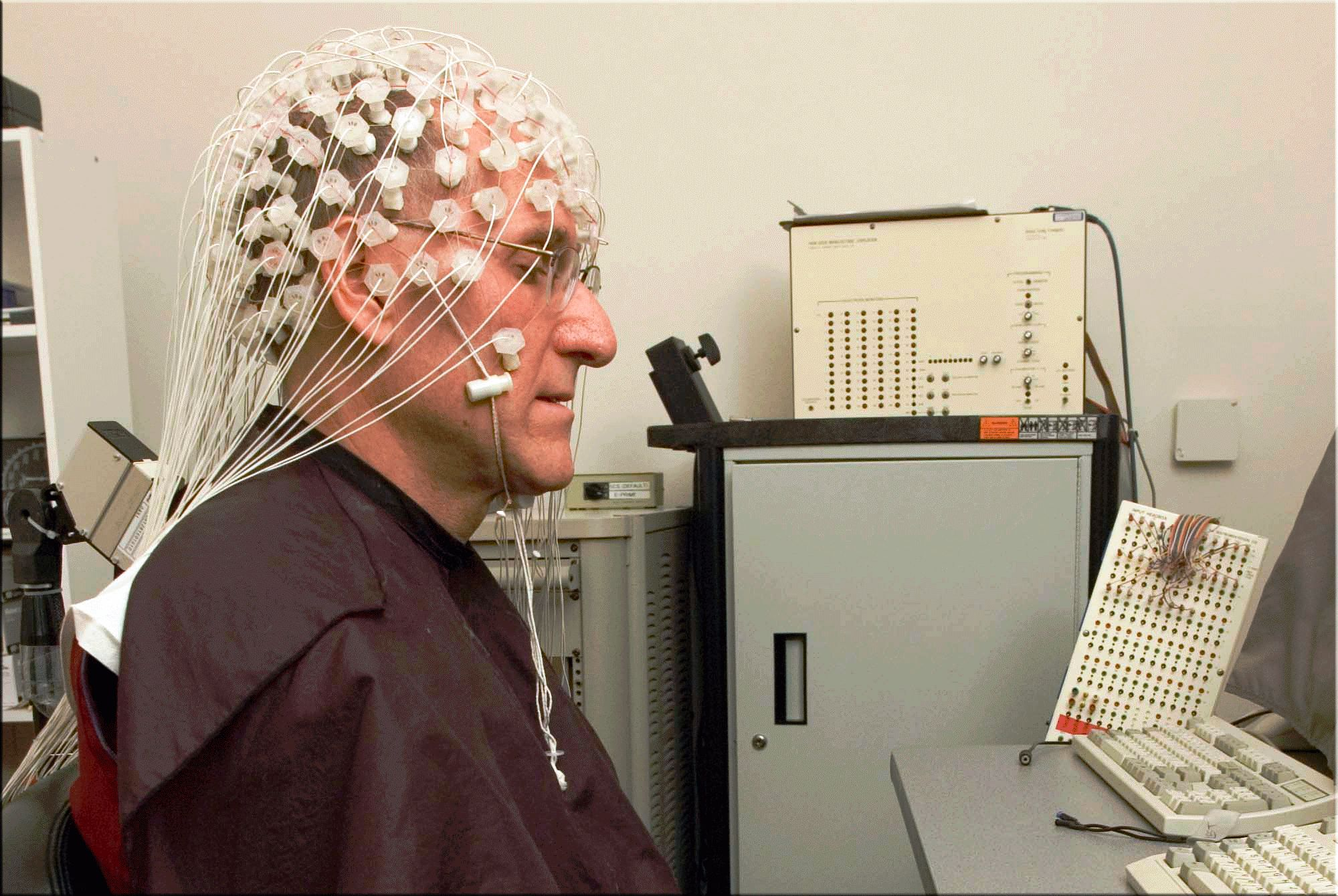
Kerzin meditating with EEG for neuroscience research

In the mid-2000s, Kerzin served as a research subject in neuroscience research into the effects of meditation on the brain led by Richard J Davidson at the University of Wisconsin, as well as at Princeton University.

Kerzin founded the Human Values Institute in Japan in 2010, since teaching there starting in 2007; he serves as chairman of the organization. The institute holds an annual symposium in Tokyo, and leads pilgrimages on the island of Shikoku; the education focuses on healthy physical and emotional living and handling death compassionately. He taught about the Heart Sutra at the Gokokuji Temple in Tokyo shortly after the 2011 Tōhoku earthquake and tsunami.

In 2014, Kerzin founded the Altruism in Medicine Institute (AIMI) in the US. He participated in a 2011 weeklong workshop organized by scientists at the Max Planck Institute for Human Cognitive and Brain Sciences in Leipzig, exploring the role that compassion training has in changing human behavior and emotions. The workshop led to a documentary film and a multimedia book to which Kerzin contributed two chapters.

Kerzin had a visiting professorship at the Central University of Tibetan Studies, Varanasi, India in 2006. At the University of Hong Kong he was appointed 'Visiting Professor of Medicine' for 2014 and 2015 and was made an Honorary Professor at the university's Centre of Buddhist Studies in March 2015. Kerzin is a fellow of the Mind & Life Institute, which was initiated in 1985 to foster a dialogue between Buddhist scholars and Western scientists.

When the Altruism in Medicine Institute's (AIMI) moved its headquarters to Pittsburgh, Kerzin received a Proclamation from the Mayor of Pittsburgh, William Peduto, honouring Kerzin and AIMI's work as well as declaring November 19, 2021 as "Altruism in Medicine Institute Day" in Pittsburgh.

== Publications ==
Kerzin is the author of No Fear No Death: The Transformative Power of Compassion; Nāgārjuna’s Wisdom: A Practitioner’s Guide to the Middle Way; The Tibetan Buddhist Prescription for Happiness (in Japanese); Mind and Matter: Dialogue between Two Nobel Laureates (in Japanese).

He delivered a TEDx talk, on Happiness in 2010, in 2014 on Compassion and Anger Management, and in 2022 at TEDx Pittsburgh 'Time Capsule' on compassion and resilience.

Kerzin was featured in the 2006 U.S. Public Broadcasting Service documentary entitled The New Medicine. This TV documentary received a largely negative review in the Wall Street Journal, but a more positive one appeared in the New York Times.
