= Contemplative neuroscience =

== History and Origins ==
Contemplative neuroscience (or contemplative science) is an emerging field of research that focuses on the changes within the mind, brain, and body as a result of contemplative practices, such as mindfulness-based meditation, samatha meditation, dream yoga, yoga nidra, tai chi or yoga. Increased psychological interest in meditation, mindfulness, compassion, and related practices contributed to the emergence of the field contemplative sciences. The term "contemplative neuroscience" was coined by Davidson and colleagues to describe the new interest of research at the intersection of meditation studies and neuroscience.

Mindfulness was originally introduced to into Western clinical contexts in 1979 when Jon Kabat-Zinn began teaching it in a hospital program at the University of Massachusetts. The integration of contemplative science practices with Western scientific research in the late 20th century has been described as significant development in history. The science is interdisciplinary and attempts to clarify such mind-brain-body changes across emotional, behavioral, cognitive, and perceptual domains with an emphasis for relating such changes to neurobiology and first-person experience. Early work focused mainly on whether meditation was associated with measurable benefits for health and well-being, whereas the more recent research has emphasized a shift towards a closer examination of mechanisms by which specific contemplative techniques modify the mind and brain. It often emphasizes Buddhist approaches to contemplation and meditation, and conflates meditation with various contemplative practices. Founders of the field include Richard Davidson, Francisco Varela and B. Alan Wallace, among others.

One of the field's first high-profile public gatherings was the Mind and Life Institute’s public dialogue, held at MIT in 2003, entitled 'Investigating the Mind'. Participants included the 14th Dalai Lama, Nobel Laureate scientist Daniel Kahneman and Eric Lander, Director of the MIT Centre for Genomic Research. This conference, attended by 1,200 scientists and contemplatives, marked the public birth of contemplative neuroscience in the US.

== Research Findings ==
Research in Contemplative Science has expanded due to the use neuro-imaging. Results from these studies report changes consistent with greater functional efficiency and integration across large-scale brain networks, as well as structural differences in regions associated with attention and self regulation. Physiological research has examined health outcomes, with some studies reporting decreased cortisol levels, decreased pain, and improvement in immune responses.

Behavioral and cognitive studies have explored the influence of contemplative training on attention and social behavior. Reported effects include improvements in attention control, working memory, conflict monitoring, and affective processing. Contemplative practices and mindfulness has also been incorporated into clinical settings, where interventions have demonstrated usefulness for people who have Depression, Anxiety, Substance or behavioral addictions, and Schizophrenia.

== Contemporary Developments ==
In their research, Garcia-Campayo and colleagues explain that several universities such as, Brown University, Naropa University, and University of San Diego, have also established courses and research programs devoted to contemplative studies or related fields.

== See also ==
- Compassion and neuropsychology
- Neuroscience and empathy
- Neurological basis of unconditional love
- Brain activity and meditation
- Research on meditation
- James Austin
- James Doty
- Mindfulness
