= James Doty =

James Doty may refer to:

- James Duane Doty (1799–1865), 19th-century American politician
- James Doty (physician) (born 1955), professor of neurosurgery at Stanford University
