= Mind & Life Institute =

American nonprofit organization

- Founded: 1991; 35 years ago
- Founder: R. Adam Engle; Francisco J. Varela; His Holiness the Dalai Lama
- Type: Non-profit
- Purpose: Scientific understanding of the mind, Contemplative Sciences, Contemplative Practice, Neuroscience, Meditation, Phenomenology, Consciousness
- Location: 210 Ridge McIntire Road Suite 325, Charlottesville, VA 22903
- Coordinates: = 38°01′54″N 78°29′04″W
- Origins: Mind & Life Dialogues
- Region served: Worldwide
- Method: Research Grants, Conferences and webinars, Podcast
- Key people: Francisco J. Varela; The 14th Dalai Lama; President Susan Bauer-Wu
- Website: www.mindandlife.org
- Formerly called: Mind & Life Dialogues

The Mind & Life Institute is a US-registered, not-for-profit 501(c)(3) organization founded in 1991 to establish the field of contemplative sciences. Based in Charlottesville, the institute “brings science and contemplative wisdom together to better understand the mind and create positive change in the world." Over three decades, Mind & Life has played a key role in the mindfulness meditation movement by funding research projects and think tanks, and by convening conferences and dialogues with the Dalai Lama. Since 2020, Mind & Life's grant-making, events, and digital programs have sought to nurture personal well-being, build more compassionate communities, and strengthen the human–earth connection.

== Origins: dialogues and publications ==
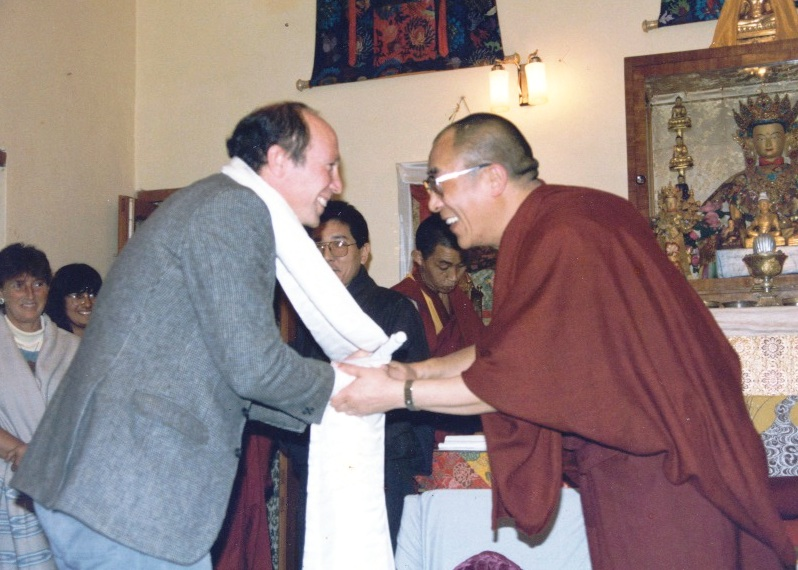
R. Adam Engle with Tenzin Gyatso, the 14th Dalai Lama, at the first Mind and Life dialogue, 1987, Dharamsala

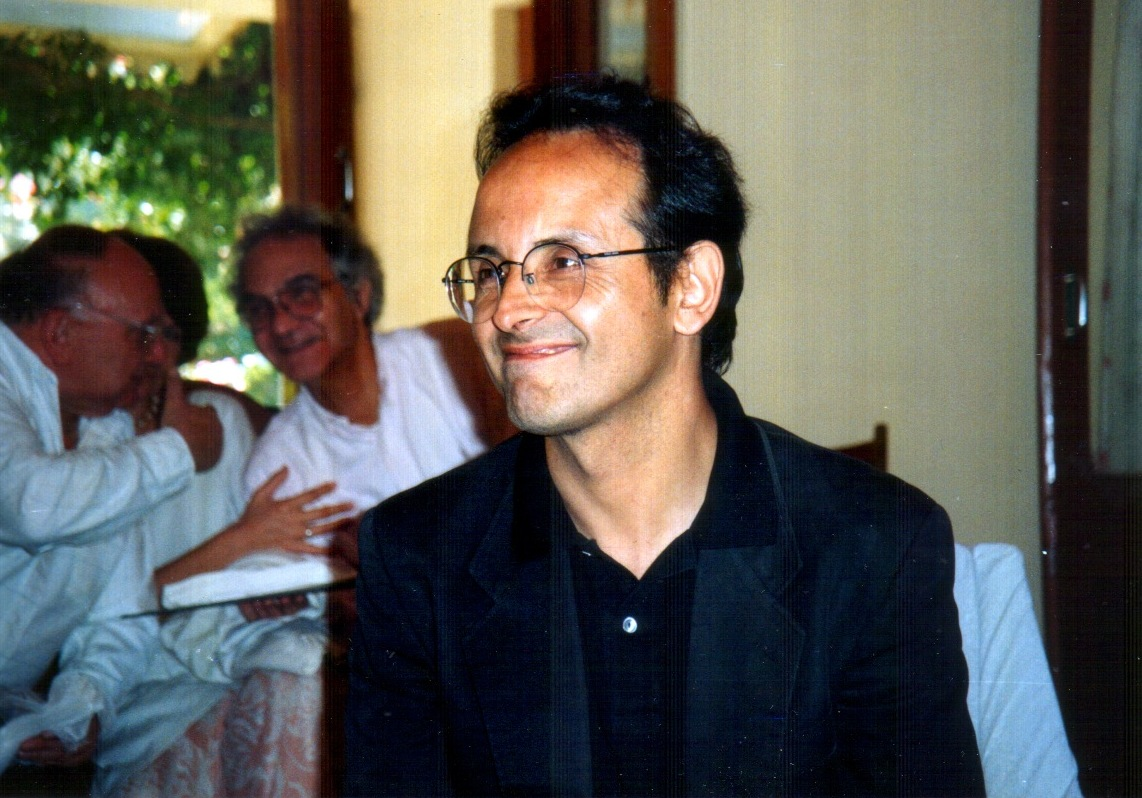
Francisco J. Varela in Dharamsala, 1994

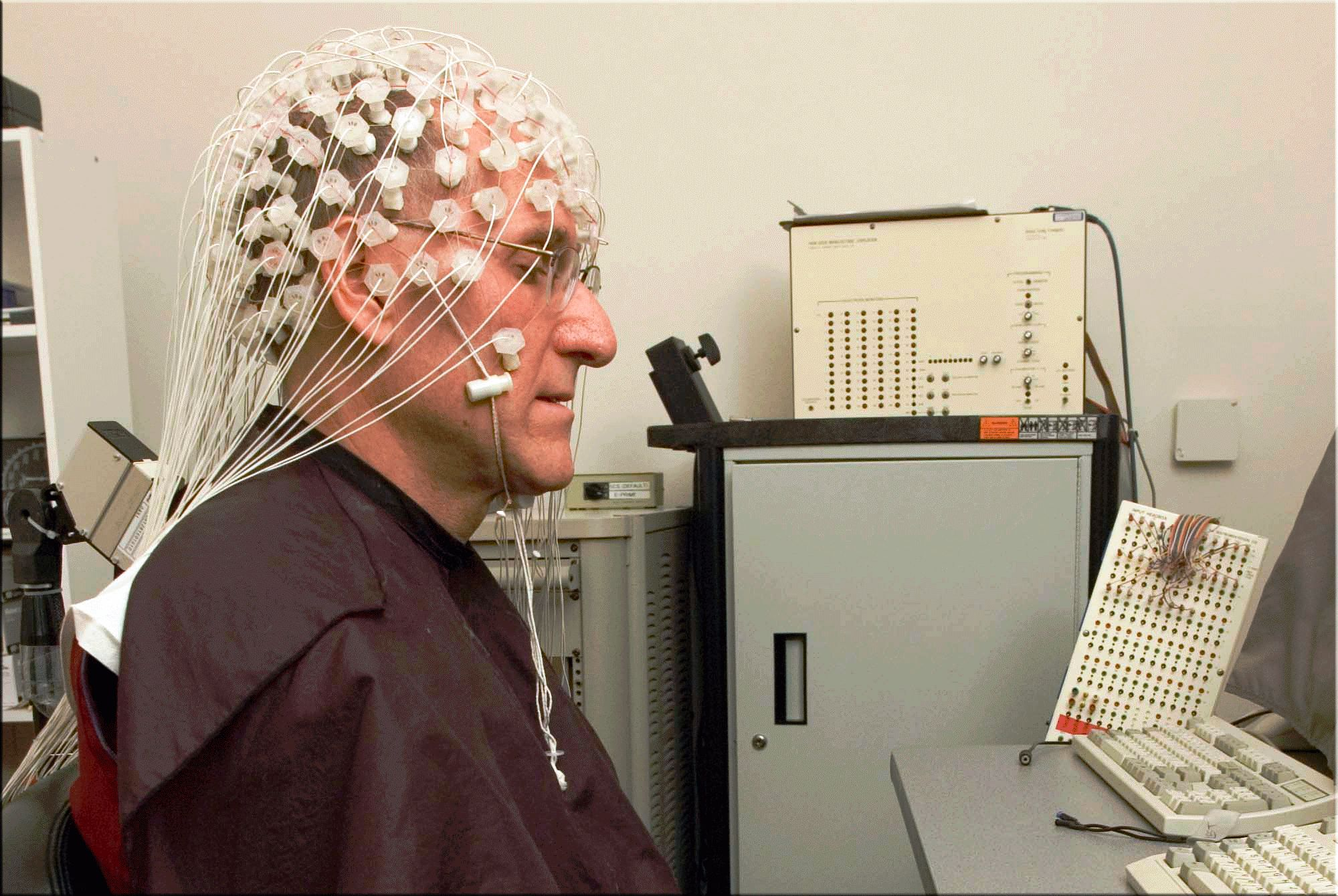
Barry Kerzin, an American Professor of Medicine and Buddhist monk meditating with EEG for MLI neuroscience research

Mind & Life Dialogues, forerunners of the Institute, were initiated by American entrepreneur R. Adam Engle in 1983. He heard of Tenzin Gyatso, the 14th Dalai Lama’s interest in modern science and offered to arrange a dialogue for him with selected scientists. The Dalai Lama accepted and authorised Engle to set one up.

In 1984 Chilean neuroscientist Francisco Varela heard about this. Having participated in a conference on consciousness attended by the Dalai Lama in 1983, and like Engle a Buddhist practitioner since 1974, he was interested in further exploration of the interface between science and Buddhism and contacted Engle, offering to assist.

Engle, Varela, and the Dalai Lama saw Buddhism and science as different methodologies with a similar aim: to investigate nature and reality, using knowledge gained to improve the quality of life and the planet. They concurred that science uses technology and the scientific method as its means while Buddhism uses the human nervous system refined by meditation and rigorous mental and emotional training. Until then, there had been no mechanism for scientists and Buddhist masters to meet and share their findings in dialogue. The concept pioneered a new interdisciplinary, cross-cultural engagement.

Engle organized the original Mind and Life Dialogue in October 1987 at the Dalai Lama’s residence in Dharamshala as a week-long event. Six scientists including Varela, two interpreters and the Dalai Lama spent five hours daily, sharing views and discussing the sciences of the mind. At the end, Engle asked the Dalai Lama if he wanted to do it again. The answer was "yes", and the series of dialogues was born.

The second dialogue was a two-day event in October 1989 in Newport Beach, California. At the third dialogue, held in Dharamsala in 1990, it was decided that in order to organize and fund further dialogues and potential research programmes the Mind & Life Institute should be incorporated as a non-profit organization in the US. The institute was incorporated in 1991. Engle was elected Chair and CEO, a post he held for 22 years until his retirement in 2012 having guided its development into "a worldwide and influential organization bringing together the highest standards of modern science and contemplative practice." Engle was then succeeded by the physicist and author Arthur Zajonc.

By 1998 Mind & Life had hosted seven dialogues between numerous world renowned scientists, philosophers and the Dalai Lama on cognitive neuroscience and physics, and published six books relating the dialogues to the general public.

By 2019, 33 Dialogues with the Dalai Lama had been hosted. The format then shifted to shorter, more frequent conversations between leading thinkers and spiritual leaders such as the Dalai Lama on critical issues of modern life at the intersection of scientific and contemplative understanding.

In 2020, Mind & Life refined its strategic vision and expanded its digital programming, including the launch of the Mind & Life Podcast, to elevate key insights that inspire action toward positive change.

== Establishment of research agenda ==
In 1998, to increase Mind & Life's potential for societal benefits, Engle broadened its mission to include carrying out scientific research. This idea was encouraged by the Dalai Lama, who, at the next dialogue in 2000, suggested scientific investigation under laboratory conditions to establish whether Buddhist contemplative practices could be of significant benefit to modern society, and if so to find a way of teaching the subject in a secular environment. A research program was launched accordingly as a result of Mind & Life's first public dialogue, held at MIT in 2003, entitled "Investigating the Mind". Participants included Nobel Laureate scientist Daniel Kahneman and Eric Lander, Director of the MIT Centre for Genomic Research. This conference was attended by 1,200 people and marked the birth of contemplative neuroscience.

In 2004, Mind & Life launched its Summer Research Institute at the Garrison Institute in New York. This conference presented the first curriculum on contemplative neuroscience to graduate students, post doctorates and science faculty members.

In the same year, Mind & Life started the Francisco J. Varela Research Awards, which provided pilot study funding to qualified applicants on a competitive basis. Through this and other grant mechanisms, by 2020, Mind & Life had awarded more than $5.2 million to over 270 projects in cognitive science, psychology, medicine, anthropology, religious studies, and education—in 30 US states and 20 countries. As a result of Mind & Life funding, more than 280 scholarly articles and books have been published, and grantees have gone on to compete successfully for over $110 million in follow-on grant funding from other sources.

In 2012 Mind & Life hosted its inaugural International Symposium on Contemplative Studies (ISCS) in Denver, Colorado, with 700 attendees from the field of Contemplative Science and Studies research. Subsequent research conferences were held in Boston (2014), San Diego (2016), Phoenix (2018), and online (2020).

== Publications relating to the dialogues ==
- Mind & Life 1, 1987: Hayward, Jeremy W.; Varela, Francisco J, eds. (1992) Gentle Bridges: Conversations with the Dalai Lama on the Sciences of Mind. Boston MA., Shambhala Publications. ISBN 1-57062-893-9.
- Mind & Life 2, 1989: Houshmand, Zara; Livingston, Robert B.; Wallace B. Alan, eds. (1999) Consciousness at the Crossroads: Conversations with the Dalai Lama on Brain Science and Buddhism. Ithaca, New York: Snow Lion Publications. ISBN 978-1559391276.
- Mind & Life 3, 1990: Goleman, Daniel, ed. (2003) Healing Emotions: Conversations with the Dalai Lama on Mindfulness, Emotions and Health. Boston MA: Shambala Publications. ISBN 9781590300107.
- Mind & Life 4, 1992: His Holiness the Dalai Lama (author), Varela, Francisco J, ed. (1997) Sleeping, Dreaming, and Dying: An Exploration of Consciousness. Somerville, MA., Wisdom Publications. ISBN 0861711238.
- Mind & Life 5, 1995: Davidson, Richard, Harrington, Anne; eds. (2002) Visions of Compassion: Western Scientists and Tibetan Buddhists Examine Human Nature. Oxford University Press, New York. ISBN 019513043X.
- Mind & Life 6, 1997: Zajonc, Arthur, ed. (2004) The New Physics and Cosmology: Dialogues with the Dalai Lama. Oxford University Press, New York. ISBN 9780195159943.
- Mind & Life 8, 2000: Goleman, Daniel. (2003) Destructive Emotions: A Scientific Dialogue with the Dalai Lama. New York: Random House, ISBN 0553801716.
- Mind & Life 10, 2002: Luisi, Pier Luigi, Houshmand, Zara. (2009) Discussions with the Dalai Lama on the nature of reality. Columbia University Press, New York. ISBN 978-0-231-14550-3
- Mind & Life 11, 2003: Harrington, Anne; Zajonc, Arthur, eds. (2006) The Dalai Lama at MIT. Harvard University Press. ISBN 0-674-02319-6
- Mind & Life 12, 2004: Begley, Sharon. (2007) Train Your Mind, Change Your Brain: How a New Science Reveals Our Extraordinary Potential to Transform Ourselves, New York: Ballantine Books. ISBN 978-0-345-47989-1.
- Mind & Life 13, 2005: Kabat-Zinn, Jon; Davidson, Richard. (2012) The Mind's Own Physician: A Scientific Dialogue with the Dalai Lama on the Healing Power of Meditation. New Harbinger Publications, Oakland CA, ISBN 9781572249684.
- Mind & Life 14, 2010: Singer, Tania; Ricard, Matthieu. (2015) Caring Economics. Picador. ISBN 9781250064127
- Mind & Life 15, 2013: Hasenkamp, Wendy; White, Janna, eds. (2017) The Monastery and the Microscope: Conversations with the Dalai Lama on Mind, Mindfulness, and the Nature of Reality. Yale University Press. ISBN 978-0-300-21808-4.

== Bibliography ==
- Barinaga, Marcia. "Studying the Well-Trained Mind", Science, 3 October 2003, Vol. 302 no. 5642 pp. 44–46, doi:10.1126/science.302.5642.44
- Watson, Gay. (2008) Beyond happiness: deepening the dialogue between Buddhism, psychotherapy and the mind sciences, Karnac Books, ISBN 978-1-85575-404-1
- Wallace, B. Alan. (2003) Buddhism & Science: breaking new ground, Columbia University Press, Appendix: a History of the Mind and Life Institute : pp. 417–421.
