= Rajesh Kasturirangan =

Indian mathematician

- Born: India
- Education: Massachusetts Institute of Technology; University of Wisconsin–Madison; IIT, Kanpur
- Website: http://rajeshkasturirangan.com/

Rajesh Kasturirangan is a mathematician and a cognitive scientist from India whose research is on how language and concepts are grounded in the world.

He completed his M.Sc in 1993 at IIT Kanpur, and Ph.D. in mathematics from University of Wisconsin–Madison in 1998. He then did another PhD in Cognitive Science at Massachusetts Institute of Technology 2004 under the supervision of Whitman Richards. His dissertation was "Mapping Spatial Relations".

== Career and research ==
He was a research scientist at Department of Brain and Cognitive Science, MIT, before joining NIAS Bangalore. His research interests vary from applying a combination of philosophical argument, mathematical techniques and empirical observations to classical problems in cognitive science and the philosophy of mind such as the semantics of natural languages, the epistemology of beliefs and the structure of intentionality and consciousness. Rajesh Kasturirangan holds an adjunct appointment at Azim Premji University.

== Recognition ==
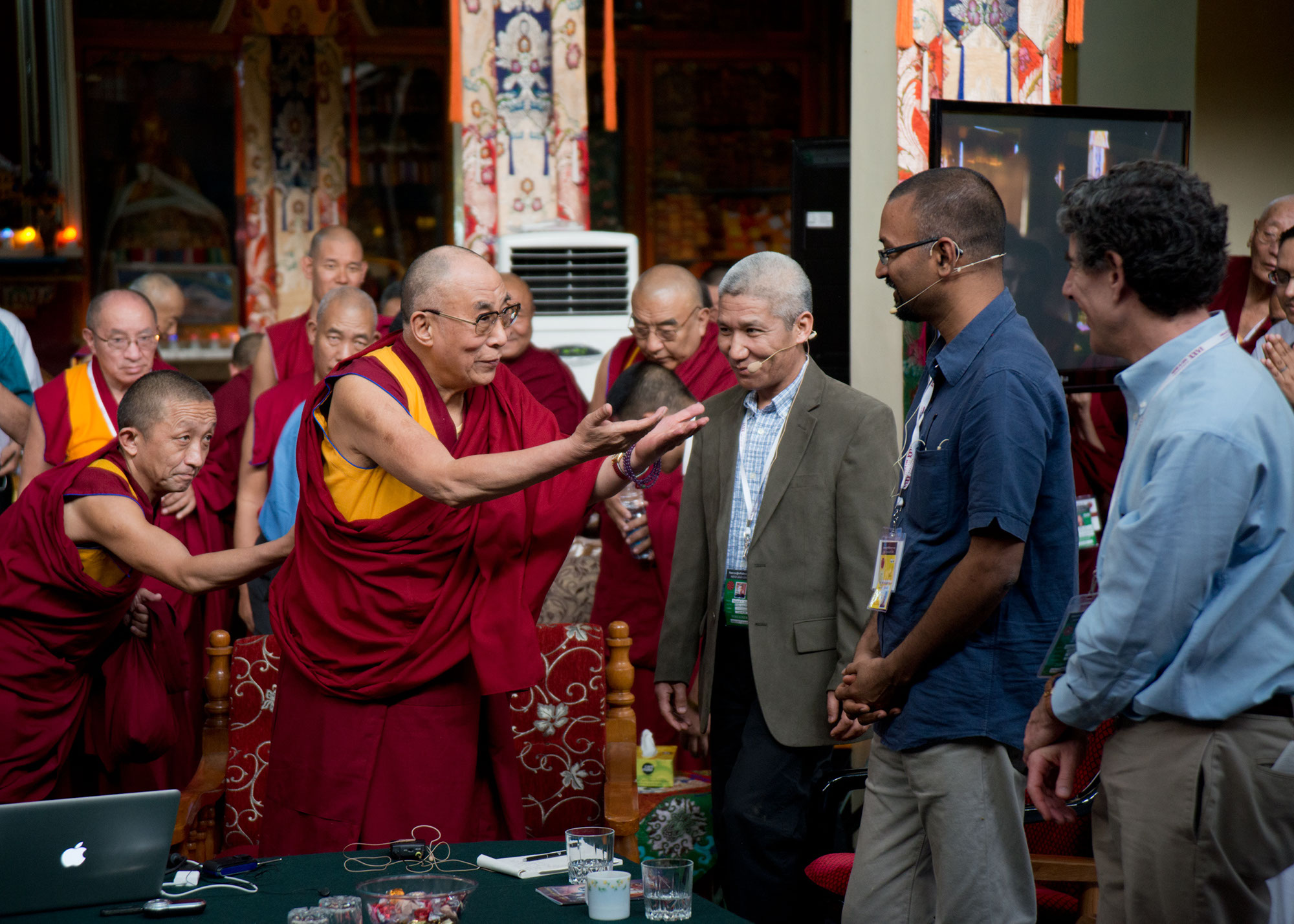
Prof. Rajesh Kasturirangan with the 14th Dalai Lama, Geshe Thupten Jinpa and Richard Davidson at Mind and Life Institute XXVI conference.

He was awarded the Burnett Foundation Doctoral Dissertation Fellowship (MIT), and Copeland Fellowship, Amherst College. He was a visiting Scholar at School of Interdisciplinary Studies, Institute for Advanced Study, and also a fellow at Mind and Life Institute. He was an invited speaker for numerous conferences and talks on education and philosophy. He was one among the twenty of the world's foremost scientists and philosophers, who were invited to speak at The Mind and Life XXVI conference, held on 17–22 January 2013.
