= Padma Samten =

Lama Padma Samten
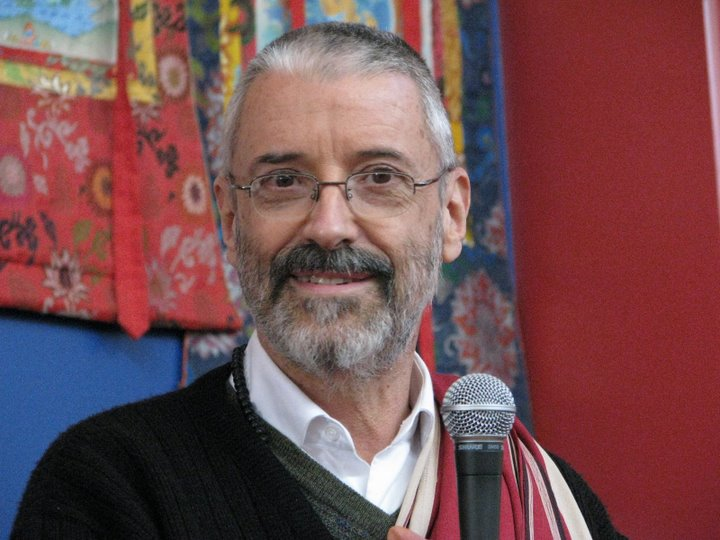
- Title: Lama

Personal life
- Born: Alfredo Aveline; 1949 (age 76–77) Brazil

Religious life
- Religion: Buddhism
- School: Vajrayana (Nyingma)

Senior posting
- Teacher: Chagdud Tulku Rinpoche
- Website: http://cebb.org.br

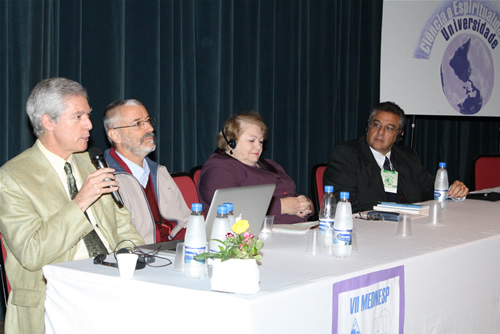
B. Alan Wallace, Padma Samten, Marlene Rossi Severino Nobre and Roberto Lúcio Vieira de Souza, Brazil, UFRGS, 2009

Padma Samten (formerly Alfredo Aveline) is a Brazilian Buddhist lama.

Alfredo Aveline has bachelor's and master's degrees in quantum physics from Universidade Federal do Rio Grande do Sul (UFRGS), where he was professor from 1969 to 1994. During those years, he studied quantum physics, a theory in which he found a similarity with Buddhist thought. In the early 1980s, his interest in Buddhism was intensified. In 1986, he founded Bodhisattva Center for Buddhist Studies (CEBB). In 1993, he was accepted by Chagdud Tulku Rinpoche as his disciple and in 1996 he was ordained lama, a title meaning leader, priest and teacher. Since that time, Lama Samten has traveled and taught, helping to structure and sustain practice groups throughout Brazil.

Lama Samten received training from teachers of various Buddhist traditions including Zen, and traveled to Asia on several occasions. He has contributed to bring masters, including Chagdud Tulku Rinpoche, B. Alan Wallace and the Dalai Lama, to Brazil. In Viamão (RS), where he resides, is located the temple, the school and the community houses of the Bodhisattva Center for Buddhist Studies (CEBB). Lama Samten has been a teacher, lecturer and consultant in companies, government agencies, hospitals, buddhist temples and universities.

Because of his work integrating Buddhism and mind training to the fields of psychology, medicine, economy and education, he has been awarded honorary citizenship in Curitiba (2008) and Viamão (2012).

== Books ==
- A Jóia dos Desejos (ed. Fundação Peirópolis, 2001, brochura, 168 pág. ISBN 858566360X)
- Meditando a Vida (ed. Fundação Peiropólis, 2001, brochura, 160 pág. ISBN 8585663545)
- Mandala do Lótus (ed. Fundação Peiropólis, 2006, brochura, 160 pág. ISBN 857596092X)
- O Lama e o Economista (ed. Rima, 2007, brochura, 121 pág. ISBN 8576560275)
- A Roda da Vida (ed. Fundação Peirópolis, 2010, capa dura, 160 pág. ISBN 8575961829)
