= The Mind and the Brain =

2002 book by Jeffrey M. Schwartz and Sharon Begley

- Author: Jeffrey M. Schwartz; Sharon Begley
- Language: English
- Subject: Neuroplasticity; Philosophy
- Publisher: ReganBooks
- Publication date: 2002
- Publication place: United States
- Pages: 432
- ISBN: 978-006039355-7
- Website: https://www.harpercollins.com/products/the-mind-and-the-brain-jeffrey-m-schwartzsharon-begley

The Mind and the Brain, written by Jeffrey M. Schwartz and Sharon Begley, published in 2002, examines the mind-body problem introduced by Descartes, and attempts to reconcile material determinism with free will, and resolve the conflict between science and moral philosophy. In this effort, the book cites past thinkers such as the Buddha and William James, and discusses research in the areas of neuroplasticity, mindfulness meditation and quantum physics, to support the concept of mental force as a force that can be developed and applied to exercise free will at the quantum level in the brain, to use the power of the mind to shape the brain.

== Reviews ==
Several reviewers have praised the book:

- Mohamed Sabaawi wrote in Journal of Child and Family Studies, "[T]he authors offer the first scientific proof that validates the power of mindfulness in shaping the brain. This work opens new vistas for revolutionary applications of mindfulness-based treatment in neuropsychiatric dysfunction."
- A review by Richard Barbieri stated, "Schwartz's book is ... about the classic mind-body debate. He argues quite effectively that if a person can, by conscious effort, change the physical structure of his brain, then we need not accept the post-Cartesian view that 'the mind is what the brain does' ..."
- Maria Albergato's review expressed the opinion, "The concepts in the book are profound. They are grounded in science and philosophy and expressed with clarity and insight."
- A review by David L. Johnson, Ph.D., concluded, "This promising model of brain functioning and the need to literally pay attention for change has prospective applications to and many implications for medicine, rehabilitation, mental health treatment, social service, addiction intervention, and the moral education practices in today's changing world."
- In his review John Abbondanza wrote,"The actual citations in the book go on and on, but the main point is clear. The brain reorganizes itself based on its use. This is called 'use-dependent cortical reorganization', and is thought to be the basis of recovery after brain injury or stroke."

Others have found the evidence and arguments presented in the book unsatisfactory:

- In New Scientist, Itiel Dror wrote, "I was disappointed to discover that Schwartz merely provides a “new cover to an old book” rather than using new research and technology to provide new ideas and insights"
- A review in Publishers Weekly concluded, "Unfortunately, their integration of quantum mechanics and Buddhism into a search for a mechanism to explain the patterns scientists have been discovering is too superficial to fully engage readers. Nonetheless, a great deal in this book is sure to motivate discussion and more research."
