= MuJoCo =

Physics engine

- Stable release: 3.14.0 / September 22, 2026; 1 day ago
- Written in: C, C++, Python, C#
- License: Apache-2.0 license
- Website: mujoco.org
- Repository: https://github.com/google-deepmind/mujoco

MuJoCo, short for Multi-Joint dynamics with Contact, is a general purpose physics engine that is tailored to scientific use cases such as robotics, biomechanics and machine learning. It was first developed in the Movement Control Laboratory at the University of Washington and described in 2012 in a paper by Emanuel Todorov, Tom Erez, and Yuval Tassa. It was later commercialized under Roboti LLC. According to a Google Scholar search, as of April 2024 the original publication has been cited 5329 times, and the MuJoCo engine 9250 times. It was described by Zhao and Queralta in their review as one of "the most widely used simulators in the literature".

MuJoCo was acquired by Google DeepMind in October 2021 and open-sourced under the Apache 2.0 license in May 2022. Parts of the Deepmind control suite are powered by the MuJoCo engine.

== See also ==
- PhysX
- Bullet
- Havok Physics
- List of robotics software
