= Emanuel Todorov =

Artificial-intelligence researcher (born 1971)

Emanuel V. Todorov
- Born: 1971 (age 54–55); Sofia, Bulgaria
- Education: West Virginia Wesleyan College B.S. (1993); Massachusetts Institute of Technology Ph.D. (1998)
- Scientific career
- Fields: Neuroscience, Artificial Intelligence,
- Workplaces: University of Washington
- Doctoral advisor: Michael I. Jordan; Whitman Richards
- Website: homes.cs.washington.edu/~todorov/

Emanuel (Emo) Vassilev Todorov (born 1971), a neuroscientist, is an associate professor and director of the Movement Control Laboratory at the University of Washington. He introduced the use of optimal control as a formal explanatory framework for biological movement (see below). He is the principal developer of the MuJoCo physics engine.

Todorov completed his PhD in MIT under the supervision of Michael Jordan and Whitman Richards. He was a postdoctoral fellow at the Gatsby Computational Neuroscience Unit at UCL under Peter Dayan and Geoffrey Hinton. He is a recipient of the 2004 Sloan Fellowship in neuroscience.

In 2002 he proposed that stochastic optimal control principles are a good theoretical framework for explaining biological movement. In 2011 this view was acknowledged by one of its critics, Karl Friston, to have become "the dominant paradigm for understanding motor behavior in formal or computational terms." It has been described in the popular scientific press together with other connections between biology and optimisation principles. An editorial comment by Kenji Doya about one of Todorov's articles in PNAS called it "a refreshingly new approach in optimal control based on a novel insight as to the duality of optimal control and statistical inference".

His work on robotic hands has been featured in popular publications on robotics. In January 2017 he was interviewed for the Robots Podcast.

He is the recipient of 11 National Science Foundation grant awards totalling more than $7.5 million as Principal Investigator.
