= Whitman Richards =

Psychologist

- Born: 1932
- Died: 16 September 2016 (aged 83–84); Newton, Massachusetts
- Education: Massachusetts Institute of Technology
- Scientific career
- Workplaces: Massachusetts Institute of Technology
- Thesis: Some Requirements for a Uniform Color Space (1965)
- Doctoral advisor: Hans-Lukas Teuber
- Doctoral students: Aaron Bobick; Donald D. Hoffman; Rajesh Kasturirangan; Alex Pentland; Joshua Tenenbaum; Emanuel Todorov

Whitman Albin Richards (1932–16 September 2016) was professor of cognitive sciences and of media arts and sciences and principal investigator in the Computer Science and Artificial Intelligence Laboratory at the Massachusetts Institute of Technology until his retirement in 2013.

He was educated at Phillips Exeter Academy and the Massachusetts Institute of Technology graduating in 1953, and becoming one of the first four PhD graduates of the Department of Brain and Cognitive Sciences in 1965.
