= Sharon Begley =

American journalist (1956–2021)

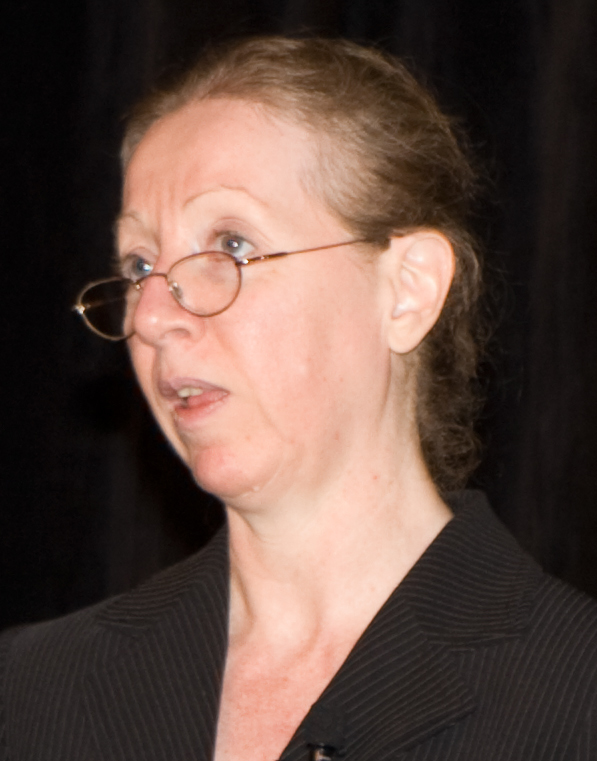
- Sharon Begley speaking at The Amaz!ng Meeting in 2008
- Born: June 14, 1956; Englewood, New Jersey, U.S.
- Died: January 16, 2021 (aged 64); Boston, Massachusetts, U.S.
- Education: Yale University (BA)
- Occupations: Columnist, journalist, author
- Employer: The Boston Globe
- Known for: Writing about science, technology, and medicine
- Notable work: Train Your Mind, Change Your Brain: How a New Science Reveals Our Extraordinary Potential to Transform Ourselves (2007)
- Spouse: Ned Groth
- Children: Sarah Begley, Dan Begley-Groth
- Website: www.sharonlbegley.com

Sharon Begley (June 14, 1956 – January 16, 2021) was an American journalist who was the senior science writer for Stat, a publication from The Boston Globe that covers stories related to the life sciences. She regularly contributed articles to the Yale Scientific Magazine while at University. She published recurring columns and feature articles in several mainstream publications on a wide variety of scientific topics. Begley was also an author and spoke at professional and community organizations. Her topics included the neuroplasticity of the brain, issues affecting science journalism, and education. She appeared on radio and television to discuss topics covered in her articles and books. Begley attracted both praise and criticism as a writer.

== Early life ==
Begley was born Sharon Lynn Begley, on June 14, 1956, in Englewood, New Jersey, to Shirley (née Wintner) and John J. Begley Jr. Her father was a stockbroker while her mother was a homemaker. She grew up in Tenafly, New Jersey, where she graduated from high school as a valedictorian. She graduated from Yale University in 1977 with a Bachelor of Arts degree in combined sciences.

== Career ==
Begley started her career as a journalist during her undergraduate studies, where she was a contributing reporter for Yale Scientific Magazine. She began work with Newsweek upon graduation in 1977, and by October 1984 she had already been named as a recipient of the Newspaper Guild of New York's Page One Award in the category of science reporting in magazines for the Newsweek article "How the Brain Works".

Begley's tenure with Newsweek established her as a well-known science communicator. She received accolades from the Religion Communicators Council for the 1998 article "Science Finds God". Her 2002 article "The Mystery of Schizophrenia" received honors from the National Alliance on Mental Illness. Other awards have cited her clarity of communication and the accessibility of her articles in furthering the public's understanding of science.

In March 2002, after 25 years at Newsweek, Begley joined The Wall Street Journal to write its weekly science column called Science Journal. Only three months later, "So Much for Destiny: Even Thoughts Can Turn Genes 'On' and 'Off", earned Begley a Front Page Award for Best Column/Editorial from the Newswomen's Club of New York. More awards followed for her reporting on a wide variety of topics related to scientific research, including an honorary doctorate of humane letters degree from the University of North Carolina.

In 2007, Begley returned to writing an award-winning science column at Newsweek. In 2010 Newsweek formed an alliance with The Daily Beast, and Begley's byline often appeared on this site as well. From 2012 until 2015 she worked as senior health and science editor at Reuters.

In August 2015, the first article appeared under the masthead of the Boston Globe's new science publication Stat with Begley as a member of the inaugural staff.

On November 7, 2025, Stat posthumously published a text by Begley, a critical obituary for James Watson she had prewritten before her own death.

== Books ==
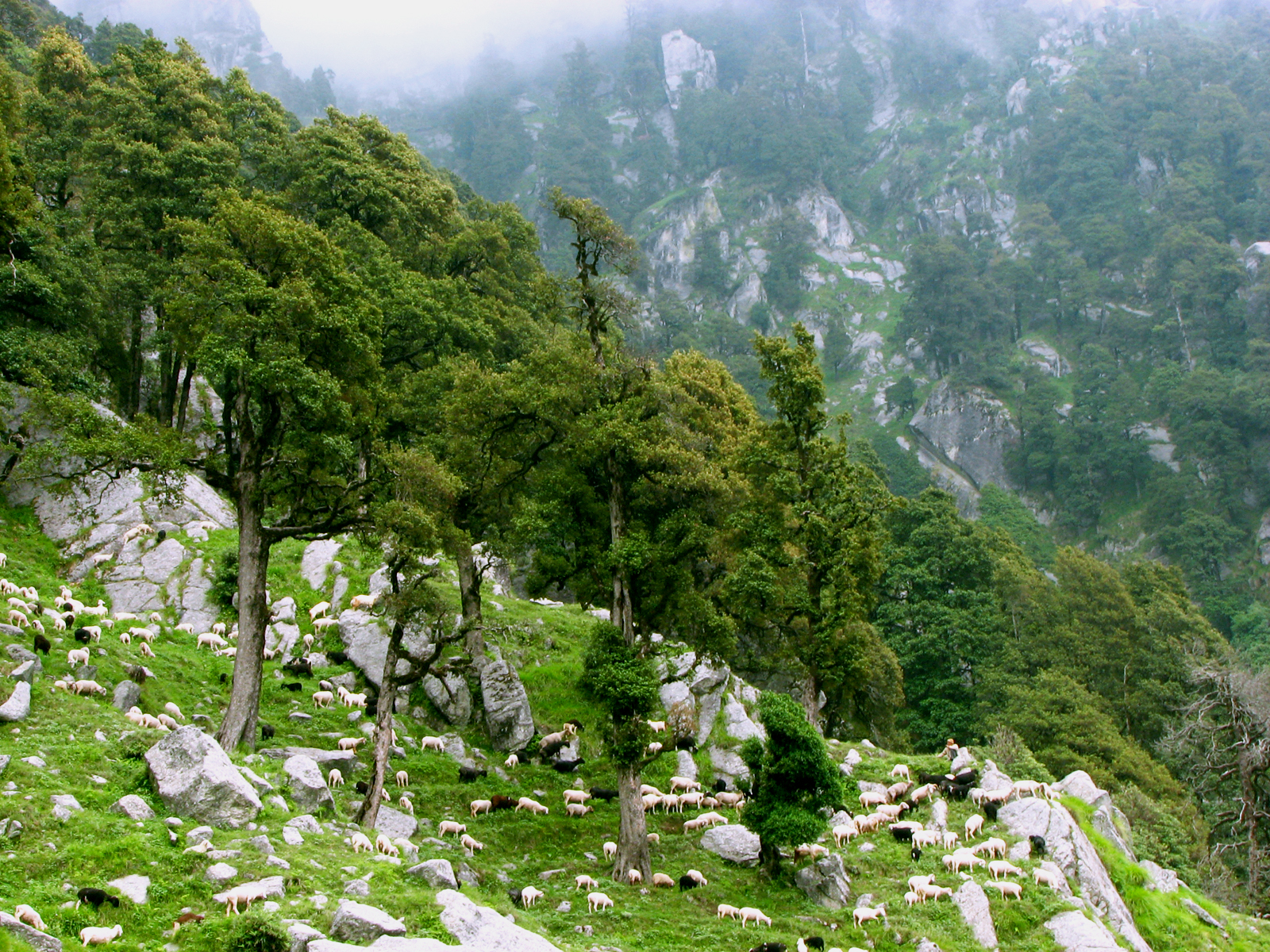
Countryside near McLeod Ganj, a scene similar to that in the opening pages of Train Your Mind, Change Your Brain

In 2002 the book The Mind and the Brain: Neuroplasticity and the Power of Mental Force, Begley and Jeffrey M. Schwartz explained the results of Schwartz's research into the origin and treatment of obsessive compulsive disorder. Here, Schwartz explores the subject of the neuroplasticity of the brain and expands upon the idea of "brain lock", a term he introduced in his 1997 book Brain Lock: Free Yourself from Obsessive-Compulsive Behavior.

Featuring a foreword written by Tenzin Gyatso, the 14th Dalai Lama and a preface by Daniel Goleman, Train Your Mind, Change Your Brain: How a New Science Reveals Our Extraordinary Potential to Transform Ourselves was published in 2007. This book begins with a description of the visit by scientists from the Mind and Life Institute to the northern Indian town of McLeod Ganj—the home of the 14th Dalai Lama in exile. The book then explores the ability of various therapeutic treatments to change the functioning of the neural pathways of the brain and the relationship between this research and the traditional meditative practices of Buddhism.

In 2012 Begley again served as a co-author, this time with Richard Davidson, for The Emotional Life of Your Brain: How its Unique Patterns Affect the Way You Think, Feel, and Live — and How You Can Change Them. The premise of this book is that each person has an individual "Emotional Style". Davidson uses six parameters to determine this Emotional Style: Resilience, Outlook, Social Intuition, Self-Awareness, Sensitivity to Context, and Attention.

== Reception ==
"Why Doctors Hate Science", published in Newsweek in 2009, prompted many critical responses. David Gorski, writing under his pen name "Orac", took issue with Begley's characterization of medical practitioners as ignoring basic medical science. One example used by Begley was that of women continuing to receive pap tests after having had total hysterectomies. Gorski looked into this claim, and found that the subject of Begley's source for this claim was full hysterectomies and hysterectomies for benign conditions of the uterus. Ongoing Pap smears are still indicated for women who have had partial hysterectomies, or who have had uterine cancer. "Begley may indeed have a point that too many pap smears are still done after hysterectomy, by simplifying and mocking she completely undermined her point–not to mention showed that she doesn't understand the issues involved. Either that, or she does understand them but decided to score cheap points against physicians instead of adding three words after "hysterectomy": "for benign disease." ... At the very least, Begley should have acknowledged that her blanket statement is more than a bit over-the-top." This and similar criticism from other defenders of the medical community prompted Begley to write a follow-up article entitled "Why Psychologists Reject Science", in which she referred to the previous article as one in which she was "asking, facetiously" why doctors hated science, but then went on to explain that, "The problem is even worse in psychology." This prompted a fresh wave of criticism, such as that expressed by Leslie Becker-Phelps in Psychology Today when she referred to Begley's article as "alarmingly misleading". Becker-Phelps stressed the intense educational requirements of the field and stated that, "the APA mandates that its member psychologists use their scientific knowledge in their clinical judgments."

When Begley's article "Placebo Power" appeared in the January/February 2013 issue of the Saturday Evening Post highlighting the perceived power of the placebo effect, it raised criticisms from science writers and skeptics. Skeptical blogger and science writer PZ Myers said of "Placebo Power", "She's got a tendency to go charging off into fluff and that's what's happened here." Myers' objection largely rested on Begley's reliance on anecdotal evidence to bolster claims of the efficacy of placebo treatments. Similar objections were raised by Steven Novella. "Those skeptics that Begley seems to dismiss have done the hard work for her and other journalists of actually reading the original research, digging down to the salient details, and teasing out the nuances that make all the difference to a proper interpretation of a complex clinical issue."

Other articles by Begley have attracted criticism from the political arena. The cover of the August 13, 2007, issue of Newsweek bore the large-print words: "Global Warming is a Hoax*", with the asterisk pointing to the smaller-print words: "*or so claim well-funded naysayers who still reject the overwhelming evidence of climate change." Anthropogenic climate change denier Marc Morano, former communications director for Oklahoma Senator Jim Inhofe, referred to the article as a "one-sided editorial, masquerading as a 'news article.'" This and other articles on the subject of climate change by Begley were cited in a press release by Morano as part of the reason for launching Climate Depot—a website devoted to denying the scientific evidence of anthropogenic climate change. Criticism of the August 13, 2007, article also came from fellow Newsweek columnist Robert Samuelson. In a column that appeared in the next issue, Samuelson characterized the article as "'fundamentally misleading' because it focused on the 'peripheral' actions of the 'denial machine' instead of the intractability of man-made warming".

== Awards ==
- 1984 Page One Award (Science Reporting in Magazines) from The Newspaper Guild of New York (for the 1983 Newsweek article "How the Brain Works")
- 1986 First place Award (Food News Reporting, circulation over 200,001) from the Association of Food Journalists
- 1992 Outstanding Achievement in Media from the American Society on Aging
- 1993 Premier Award for Space Coverage from the Aviation/Space Writers Association (for the 1992 Newsweek articles "ET Phone Us" and "The Science of Doom")
- 1997 Clarion Award (Magazine Article) from The Association for Women in Communication (for the 1996 Newsweek article "Your Child's Brain")
- 1997 Distinguished Achievement Award from the Educational Press Association of America (for the 1996 Newsweek article "Your Child's Brain")
- 1998 Wilbur Award (Magazines, National) from the Religion Communicators Council (for the 1998 Newsweek article "Science Finds God")
- 1999 PASS Award from the National Council on Crime and Delinquency (for the 1999 Life magazine cover article "The Secret Life of Teens")
- 2000 Front Page Award from the Newswomen's Club of New York
- 2000 Best Feature Reporting from the Magazine Deadline Club, New York City Chapter of the Society of Professional Journalists
- 2002 Front Page Award for Best Column/Editorial from Newspaper Newswomen's Club of New York (for the article "Even Thoughts Can Turn Genes on and Off")
- 2002 NAMI Outstanding Media Award from the National Alliance on Mental Illness (for the 2002 Newsweek article "The Mystery of Schizophrenia")
- 2004 Honorary Doctorate of Humane Letters for contributions to the public understanding of science from the University of North Carolina
- 2004 Clarion Award (Magazine Article, Weekly, Best Non-Opinion Newspaper Column) The Association for Women in Communication (for the Science Journal column)
- 2005 Clarion Award (Magazine Article, Weekly, Best Non-Opinion Newspaper Column) from The Association for Women in Communications
- 2005 Public Understanding of Science Award from The Exploratorium, San Francisco (lifetime achievement)
- 2006 Excellence in Journalism from The American Aging Association (for Coverage of Research on Alzheimer's Disease)
- 2007 Global Media Award of Excellence for Best Environmental Reporting from The Population Institute (for the 2007 Newsweek article, "The Truth About Denial")
- 2007 Genesis Award from the Humane Society of the United States (for the 2006 Newsweek article "Cry of the Wild: Gorilla Warfare")
- 2009 American Statistical Association's Excellence in Statistical Reporting Award
- 2009 First place Award from New York Association of Black Journalists (for the 2008 Newsweek article, "How Your Brain Looks at Race")
- 2009 Genesis Award for Outstanding Written Word from The Humane Society of the United States (for the 2008 Newsweek article "The Extinction Trade")

== Personal life ==
Begley married Edward Groth in 1983 and went on to have a daughter and a son. Her husband was a scientist with Consumers Union. She died on January 16, 2021, from non-smoking lung cancer.
