= Francisco Varela =

Chilean scientist and philosopher (1946–2001)

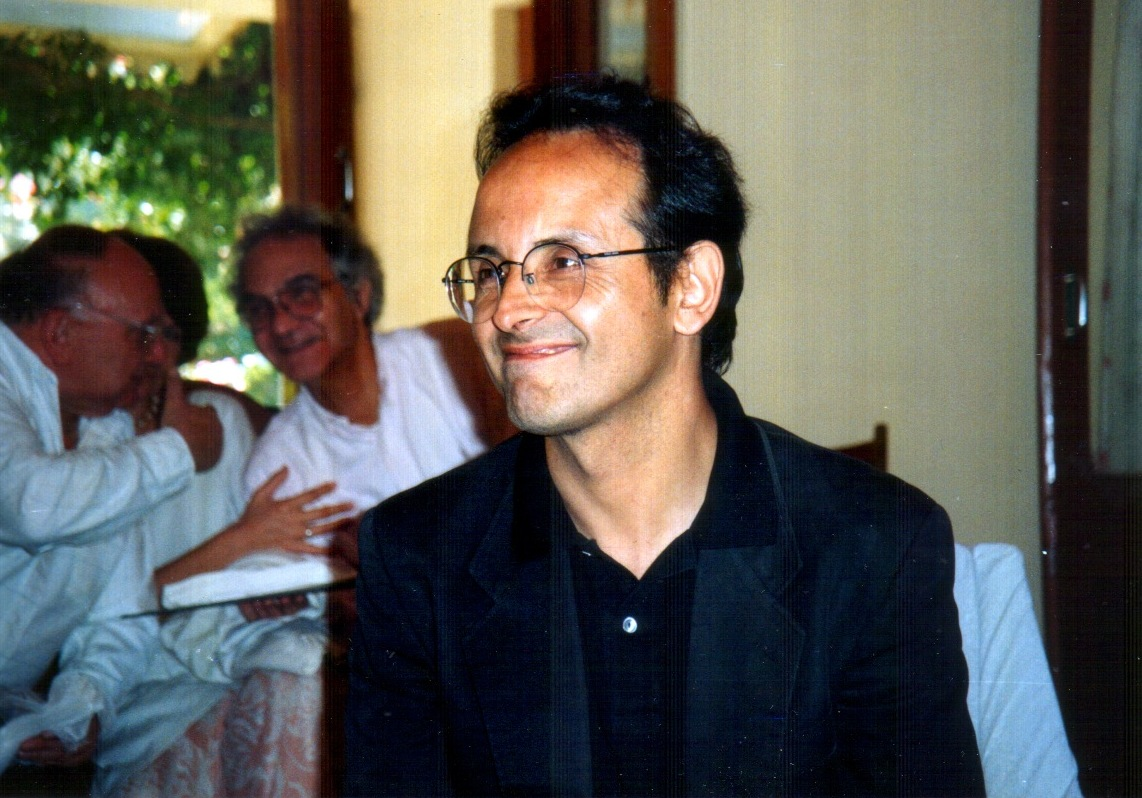
- Varela in 1994
- Born: 7 September 1946; Talcahuano, Chile
- Died: 28 May 2001 (aged 54); Paris, France
- Education: Pontifical Catholic University of Chile; University of Chile; Harvard University
- Known for: Autopoiesis; Enaction; Neurophenomenology
- Children: Leonor Varela
- Scientific career
- Workplaces: École Polytechnique; CNRS; University of Paris; Mind and Life Institute
- Thesis: Insect retinas; visual processing in the compound eye (1970)
- Doctoral advisor: Torsten Wiesel

Francisco Javier Varela García (7 September 1946 – 28 May 2001) was a Chilean biologist, philosopher, cybernetician, and neuroscientist who, together with his mentor Humberto Maturana, is best known for introducing the concept of autopoiesis to biology, and for co-founding the Mind and Life Institute to promote dialog between science and Buddhism.

== Life and career ==
Varela was born on 7 September 1946 in Talcahuano in Chile, the son of Corina María Elena García Tapia and Raúl Andrés Varela Rodríguez. After completing secondary school at the Liceo Alemán del Verbo Divino in Santiago (1951–1963), like his mentor Humberto Maturana, Varela temporarily studied medicine at the Pontifical Catholic University of Chile and graduated with a degree in biology from the University of Chile. He later obtained a PhD in biology at Harvard University. His thesis, defended in 1970 and supervised by Torsten Wiesel, was titled Insect Retinas: Information processing in the compound eye.

After the 1973 military coup led by Augusto Pinochet, Varela and his family spent 7 years in exile in the United States before he returned to Chile to become a professor of biology at the Universidad de Chile.

Varela became familiar, by practice, with Tibetan Buddhism in the 1970s, initially studying, together with Keun-Tshen Goba (né Ezequiel Hernandez Urdaneta), with the meditation master Chögyam Trungpa Rinpoche, founder of Vajradhatu and Shambhala Training, and later with Tulku Urgyen Rinpoche.

In 1986, he settled in France, where he first taught cognitive science and epistemology at the École Polytechnique, and later neuroscience at the University of Paris. From 1988 until his death, he led a research group, as director of research at the CNRS (Centre National de Recherche Scientifique).

In 1987, Varela, along with R. Adam Engle, founded the Mind and Life Institute, initially to sponsor a series of dialogues between scientists and the Dalai Lama about the relationship between modern science and Buddhism. The Institute continues today as a major nexus for such dialog as well as promoting and supporting multidisciplinary scientific investigation in mind sciences, contemplative scholarship and practice and related areas in the interface of science with meditation and other contemplative practices, especially Buddhist practices.

Varela died on 28 May 2001 in Paris of Hepatitis C after having written an account of his 1998 liver transplant. Varela had four children, including the actress, environmental spokesperson, and model Leonor Varela.

== Work and legacy ==
Varela was trained as a biologist, mathematician, and philosopher under the influence of various teachers, including Humberto Maturana and Torsten Wiesel.

He wrote and edited a number of books and numerous journal articles in biology, neurology, cognitive science, mathematics, and philosophy. He founded, with others, the Integral Institute, a thinktank dedicated to the cross-fertilization of ideas and disciplines.

Varela supported embodied cognition, viewing human cognition and consciousness in terms of the enactive structures in which they arise. These comprise the body (as a biological system and as a personally experienced one) and the physical world it enacts.

Varela's work popularized within the field of neuroscience the concept of neurophenomenology. This concept combined the phenomenology of Edmund Husserl and of Maurice Merleau-Ponty, with "first-person science." Neurophenomenology requires observers to examine their own conscious experience using scientifically verifiable methods.

In the 1996 popular book The Web of Life: A New Scientific Understanding of Living Systems, physicist Fritjof Capra makes extensive reference to Varela and Maturana's theory of autopoiesis as part of a new, systems-based scientific approach for describing the interrelationships and interdependence of psychological, biological, physical, social, and cultural phenomena. Written for a general audience, The Web of Life helped popularize the work of Varela and Maturana, as well as that of Ilya Prigogine and Gregory Bateson.

Varela's 1991 book The Embodied Mind: Cognitive Science and Human Experience, co-authored with Evan Thompson and Eleanor Rosch, is considered a classic in the field of cognitive science, offering pioneering phenomenological connections and introducing the Buddhism-informed enactivist and embodied cognition approach. A revised edition of The Embodied Mind was published in 2017, featuring substantive introductions by the surviving authors, as well as a preface by Jon Kabat-Zinn.

== Publications ==
Varela wrote numerous books and articles:

=== Books ===
- 1979. Principles of Biological Autonomy. MIT Press.
- 1980 (with Humberto Maturana). Autopoiesis and Cognition: The Realization of the Living. Boston: Reidel.
- 1987 (rev 1992, 1998) (with Maturana). The Tree of Knowledge: The Biological Roots of Human Understanding. Boston: Shambhala Press. ISBN 978-0877736424
- 1988. Connaître : Les Sciences Cognitives, tendances et perspectives. Éditions du Seuil, Paris.
- 1991 (rev 2017) (with Evan Thompson and Eleanor Rosch). The Embodied Mind: Cognitive Science and Human Experience. MIT Press. ISBN 978-0-262-72021-2
- 1992 (with P. Bourgine, eds.). Towards a Practice of Autonomous Systems: The First European Conference on Artificial Life. MIT Press.
- 1992 (with J. Hayward, eds.). Gentle Bridges: Dialogues Between the Cognitive Sciences and the Buddhist Tradition. Boston: Shambhala Press. [Reprinted, 2014, as Gentle Bridges: Conversations with the Dalai Lama on the Sciences of Mind.]
- 1993 (with W. Stein, eds.). Thinking About Biology: An Introduction to Theoretical Biology. Addison-Wesley, SFI Series on Complexity. [Reprinted, 2018, as Thinking About Biology: An Invitation to Current Theoretical Biology, CRC Press.]
- 1997 (ed.). Sleeping, Dreaming and Dying: An Exploration of Consciousness with the Dalai Lama. Boston: Wisdom Books.
- 1999. Ethical Know-How: Action, Wisdom and Cognition. Stanford University Press.
- 1999 (with J. Shear, eds.). The View from Within: First-Person Methodologies in the Study of Consciousness. London: Imprint Academic.
- 1999 (with J. Petitot, B. Pachoud, and J-M. Roy, eds.). Naturalizing Phenomenology: Contemporary Issues in Phenomenology and Cognitive Science. Stanford University Press.

=== Notable articles ===
- 2002 (with Andreas Weber). 'Life after Kant: Natural purposes and the autopoietic foundations of biological individuality'. Phenomenology and the Cognitive Sciences I: 97–125, 2002.

== See also ==
- Cartesian anxiety
- Enactivism
- Meaning-making
- Molecular cellular cognition
- Neural oscillation
- Umwelt
