= Arthur Zajonc =

American physicist and writer

Arthur Guy Zajonc (/ˈzeɪ.ənts/ ZAY-ənts; born 11 October 1949 in Boston, Massachusetts) is an American physicist and the author of several books related to science and mind; one of these is based on dialogues about quantum mechanics with the Dalai Lama. Zajonc, professor emeritus at Amherst College as of 2012, taught there starting in 1978. He served as the General Secretary of the Anthroposophical Society in America from 1994 until 2002. From January 2012 to June 2015 he was president of the Mind and Life Institute.

== Biography ==
Zajonc received a B.S. in engineering physics from the University of Michigan in 1971. He received an M.S. (1973) and Ph.D. (1976) in physics at the University of Michigan as well. From 1976 to 1978 he was a research associate at the Joint Institute for Laboratory Astrophysics at the University of Colorado and the National Bureau of Standards, Boulder, Colorado.

Zajonc became an assistant professor of physics at Amherst College in 1978, and was promoted to associate professor in 1984 and full professor in 1991. In 2006 he became an Andrew W. Mellon Professor at Amherst. He retired from this position in 2011, and is now Andrew W. Mellon Professor Emeritus at Amherst College.

From 1981 to 1982 he was a Visiting associate professor of physics at the École Normale Supérieure at the Laboratoire de Spectroscopie Hertzienne in Paris. In 1984 was a Visiting Research Physicist at the Max Planck Institute for Quantum Optics, Garching (Munich), Germany with H. Walther. In 1986 he was a visiting scientist at the Institute for Quantum Optics at Leibniz University Hannover in Germany. In 1991 he was a visiting scientist at the Department of Physics at the University of Rochester with L. Mandel. In 1993 he was a Fulbright Professor at the University of Innsbruck, Austria teaching and doing research on the experimental foundations of quantum physics.

Zajonc was the physics department chairman at Amherst College for three different appointments: 1987–1989, 1998–2000, and 2005–present. Later that same year he was a Scholar-in-Residence at the Fetzer Institute. He was the Senior Program Director of the Fetzer Institute 1995–1997. He was the director for the Academic Program of the Center for Contemplative Mind in Society from 2004 to 2009, and served as executive director from 2009 to 2012. In this role, he focused the organization's work on the development and application of contemplative practices within higher education.

Zajonc held a number of dialogues with the Dalai Lama in 1997 which were published in 2004 under his scientific coordination and editorship as Dalai Lama: The New Physics and Cosmology. He was moderator for the 2003 dialogue with the Dalai Lama at MIT.

== Other accomplishments ==
- Co-founder of the Kira Institute.
- Past president of the Lindisfarne Association.
- Co-founder of the Fetzer Institute.

== Books ==
- Zajonc, Arthur (1995). Catching the Light: The Entwined History of Light and Mind. Oxford University Press. ISBN 978-0195095753.
- Greenstein, George; Zajonc, Arthur (2005). The Quantum Challenge: Modern Research on the Foundations of Quantum Mechanics (2nd ed.). Jones and Bartlett. ISBN 978-0763724702. The first edition of this undergraduate text was published in 1997.
- Seamon, David; Zajonc, Arthur, eds. (1998). Goethe's Way of Science. State University of New York. ISBN 978-0791436820.
- Zajonc, Arthur, ed. (2004). Dalai Lama: The New Physics and Cosmology. Oxford University Press. ISBN 978-0195159943. Edited by Zajonc, this book is based on a series of conversations with the Dalai Lama and several prominent physicists about quantum mechanics.
- Harrington, Anne; Zajonc, Arthur, eds. (2008). The Dalai Lama at MIT. Harvard University Press. ISBN 978-0674027336.
- Zajonc, Arthur (2008). Meditation As Contemplative Inquiry: When Knowing Becomes Love. Lindisframe Press. ISBN 978-1584200628.
- Palmer, Parker J.; Zajonc, Arthur; Scribner, Megan (2010). The Heart of Higher Education: A Call to Renewal. Jossey-Bass. ISBN 978-0-470-48790-7. See one review by Pamela C. Crosby ("Review of The Heart of Higher Education By Palmer and Zajonc". Archived from the original on April 2, 2015.)

== See also ==
- Anthroposophy
- Quantum mysticism
