= James Doty (physician) =

American clinical professor of neurosurgery

James R. Doty
- Born: December 1, 1955; Lancaster, California
- Died: July 16, 2025 (aged 69)
- Education: University of California, Irvine; Tulane University School of Medicine
- Occupations: Neurosurgeon; entrepreneur; philanthropist

James R. Doty, M.D., FACS, FICS, FAANS (December 1, 1955 – July 16, 2025) was a clinical professor of neurosurgery at Stanford University and founder and director of the Center for Compassion and Altruism Research and Education, an affiliate of the Stanford Neurosciences Institute. He was the author of two self-help books called Into the Magic Shop: A Neurosurgeon's Quest to Discover the Mysteries of the Brain and the Secrets of the Heart (2016) and Mind Magic: The Neuroscience of Manifestation and How It Changes Everything (2024). Doty was also the Senior Editor of the book Oxford Handbook of Compassion Science (2017).

== Background ==
Doty was an American neurosurgeon, entrepreneur, and philanthropist. He received his undergraduate training in biological sciences at the University of California, Irvine, leaving in 1977 without a degree following acceptance to Tulane University School of Medicine where he graduated in 1981. He was later awarded his undergraduate degree from Irvine in 1978. He accepted a U.S. Army Health Professions Scholarship completing his internship at Tripler Army Medical Center in Honolulu, HI in 1982 and his neurosurgery residency at Walter Reed Army Medical Center in Washington, D.C. in 1987. He completed pediatric neurosurgery training at Children's Hospital of Philadelphia (CHOP) and completed a research fellowship in neurophysiology. He received board certification by the American Board of Neurological Surgery in 1990. Doty spent 9 years on active duty service in the U.S. Army Medical Department, attaining the rank of major. Doty died in July 2025.

== Research career ==
Doty's past research interests have focused on the development of technologies using focused beams of radiation in conjunction with robotics and image-guidance techniques to treat solid tumors and other pathologies in the brain and spinal cord. He is recognized as an expert in stereotactic radiosurgery and complex and minimally invasive spine surgery. Additionally, he has multiple patents including a device for spine stabilization and an electrode for monitoring of brain activity.

Doty served on Stanford's adjunct faculty for four years between 1997 and 2004. Following a sabbatical, he returned to Stanford University in 2007 and began collaborative research explorations into the neuroscience of compassion and altruism with Stanford colleagues. What had begun as an informal research initiative called "Project Compassion" was later formalized within the School of Medicine by then Dean Phil Pizzo as the Center for Compassion and Altruism Research and Education (CCARE).

As Director of CCARE, Doty has collaborated on a number of research projects focused on compassion and altruism including the use of neuro-economic models to assess altruism, use of the CCARE-developed compassion cultivation training (CCT) in individuals and its effect, assessment of compassionate and altruistic judgment utilizing implanted brain electrodes and the use of optogenetic techniques to assess nurturing pathways in rodents. He also published on the influence of mindful meditation on surgical performance.

He was on the advisory board to the Fogarty Institute of Innovation. Additionally, Doty was on the advisory board of a number of non-profit organizations including the Charter for Compassion, of whose advisory board he was vice-chair in 2016. He was the former Chairman of the Dalai Lama Foundation. Between 2012-2014, he used to write a blog on the now-closed HuffPost Contributor platform of the Huffington Post.

== Innovation and invention ==
In the late 1980s, following a conversation with his colleague, John Adler, M.D., at the time a resident at the Brigham and Women's Hospital in Boston, MA, he was introduced to the concept of the CyberKnife and later invested in the company that manufactures the device, Accuray, Inc. Following development of the prototype device at Stanford University, Doty was so convinced of its potential to change the manner in which radiation therapy was delivered that he convinced an investor to set up the first CyberKnife facility in the U.S. prior to FDA approval under an Investigational Device Exemption. Within one year of the facility opening, Accuray was effectively bankrupt having exhausted all means of raising further capital. Doty then provided ongoing funding to Accuray and became CEO. He ultimately convinced a venture firm in Taiwan to provide an infusion of funds and restructured the company, which soon thereafter received FDA approval for their CyberKnife technology. Accuray went public in 2007 (NASDAQ:ARAY) with a market cap of $1.3bn.

Doty had been successful as an entrepreneur during the dot com heyday acting as an angel investor in a number of start-up companies. Following the dot com crash, he watched his fortune evaporate and became effectively bankrupt having to sell the majority of his assets to live up to his financial obligations. Having made a number of commitments to charitable organizations, Doty donated all of the stock of Accuray ultimately donating $29,000,000 to charity.

== Philanthropy ==
Doty has set up health clinics throughout the world through his donation to Global Healing, and created programs to support AIDS-HIV programs through Family and Children Services.

His donation to Stanford University School of Medicine is one of the largest of any graduate or faculty member. He endowed the Chair of the Dean of the School of Medicine at Tulane University following Hurricane Katrina and refurbished its library, in addition to setting up a scholarship for socioeconomically disadvantaged students to commit to a career of service.

== Awards and honors ==
- Member, Founder's Circle (individuals and foundations whose gifts to Stanford have reached a total of $1 million or more), Stanford University (2009)
- Member (Outstanding Alumnus-Tulane University), The Paul Tulane Society (2008)
- One of the 56 "Healthcare Heroes", New Orleans City Business Journal (2008)

== Death ==
Doty died on July 16, 2025 as a result of complications from surgery.

== Selected publications ==
- Seppala, E. M.; Hutcherson, C. A.; Nguyen, D. T. H.; Doty, J. R.; Gross, J. J. (2014). "Loving-kindness Meditation: A tool to improve healthcare provider compassion, resilience, and patient care". Journal of Compassionate Healthcare. 1 5: 1–9. doi:10.1186/s40639-014-0005-9.
- Martin, D.; Seppala, E.; Heineberg, Y.; Rossomando, T.; Doty, J.; Zimbardo, P.; Shiuel, T.- T.; Berger, R.; Zhou, Y. Y. (2014). "The impact of social dominance orientation and economic systems justification". Journal of Business Ethics. 129: 237–249. CiteSeerX 10.1.1.694.9115. doi:10.1007/s10551-014-2157-0. S2CID 11549807.
- Ruchelli, G.; Chapin, H.; Darnall, B.; Seppala, E.; Doty, J.; Mackey, S. (2014). "Compassion meditation training for people living with chronic pain and their significant others: a pilot study and mixed-methods analysis". The Journal of Pain. 15 (4): S117. doi:10.1016/j.jpain.2014.01.479.
- Seppala, E.; Rossomando, T.; Doty, J. (2013). "Social connection and compassion: Important predictors of health and well-being". Social Research. 80 (2): 411–430. doi:10.1353/sor.2013.0027. S2CID 141321625. Archived from the original on 19 September 2015.
- Jazaieri, H.; McGonigal, K.; Jinpa, G. T.; Doty, J. R.; Gross, J. J.; Goldin, P. R. (2013). "A randomized controlled trial of compassion cultivation training: Effects on mindfulness, affect, and emotion regulation". Motivation and Emotion. 38: 23–35. doi:10.1007/s11031-013-9368-z. S2CID 35717645.
- Jazaieri, H.; Jinpa, G. T.; McGonigal, K.; Rosenberg, E. L.; Finkelstein, J.; Simon-Thomas, E.; Cullen, M.; Doty, J.; Gross, J. J.; Goldin, P. R. (2012). "Enhancing compassion: A randomized controlled trial of a Compassion Cultivation Training program". Journal of Happiness Studies. 1 (4): 1–14. CiteSeerX 10.1.1.362.5161. doi:10.1007/s10902-012-9373-z. S2CID 17669639.
- Chang, S. D.; Murphy, M.; Geis, P.; Martin, D. P.; Hancock, S. L.; Doty, J. R.; Adler, J. R. (1998). "Clinical experience with image-guided robotic radiosurgery (the Cyberknife) in the treatment of brain and spinal cord tumors". Neurologia Medico-Chirurgica. 38 (11): 780–783. doi:10.2176/nmc.38.780. PMID 9919913.
- Adler, J. R.; Chang, S. D.; Murphy M. J.; Doty, J.; Geis, P.; Hancock, S. L. (1997). "The Cyberknife: A frameless robotic system for radiosurgery". Stereotactic and Functional Neurosurgery. 69 (1–4 Pt2): 124–128. doi:10.1159/000099863. PMID 9711744.
- Doty, J. R.; Thomson, J.; Simonds, G.; Rengachary, S. S.; Gunby, E. N. (1989). "Occult intrasacral meningocele: Clinical and radiographic diagnosis". Neurosurgery. 24 (4): 616–25. doi:10.1097/00006123-198904000-00023. PMID 2710309.
- Doty, J. R.; Alving, B. M.; McDonnell, D. E.; Ondra, S. L. (1986). "Heparin-associated Thrombocytopenia in the neurosurgical patient". Neurosurgery. 19 (1): 69–72. doi:10.1227/00006123-198607000-00010. PMID 3748340.

== See also ==
- Contemplative neuroscience

== Bibliography ==
- Doty, James R. (2017). Into the Magic Shop: A Neurosurgeon's Quest to Discover the Mysteries of the Brain and the Secrets of the Heart. New York: Avery. ISBN 9780399183645.
- Doty, James R.; Brown, Stephanie L.; Cameron, C. Daryl; Seppälä, Emma M.; Simon-Thomas, Emiliana; Worline, Monica C., eds. (2017). The Oxford Handbook of Compassion Science. New York, NY: Oxford University Press. doi:10.1093/oxfordhb/9780190464684.001.0001. ISBN 9780190464684.
- Doty, James R. (2024). Mind Magic: The Neuroscience of Manifestation and How It Changes Everything. New York, New York: Avery, an imprint of Penguin Random House. ISBN 0593541146.
