= Jeffrey M. Schwartz =

American psychiatrist

- Occupations: Psychiatrist; Neuroscientist

Academic background
- Education: University of Rochester (BA); SUNY Downstate Health Sciences University (MD)

Academic work
- Institutions: UCLA School of Medicine
- Main interests: Obsessive-compulsive disorder Neuroplasticity; Intelligent design
- Website: https://jeffreymschwartz.com/

Jeffrey M. Schwartz is an American psychiatrist, neuroscientist, and researcher in the field of neuroplasticity and its application to obsessive–compulsive disorder (OCD). He is a proponent of mind–body dualism and intelligent design.

== Work with OCD ==
=== Brain lock ===
Brain lock is a term coined by Schwartz to describe obsessive–compulsive behavior. His 1997 book Brain Lock: Free Yourself from Obsessive–Compulsive Behavior outlines the disorder and its treatment. In the book Schwartz claims that obsessive–compulsive disorder (OCD) is a result of a bio-chemical imbalance that "locks" brain functions into an obsessive–compulsive pattern and that OCD can be self-treated by following four steps:

1. Relabel the obsessive thoughts and compulsive urges as obsessions and compulsions, not as real thoughts.
2. Reattribute the obsessive thoughts to a brain malfunction called OCD.
3. Refocus on a wholesome, productive activity for at least fifteen minutes.
4. Revalue the entire obsession and compulsion group as having no useful meaning in your life

=== As consultant ===
Schwartz served as consultant for the 2004 biographical film The Aviator, which depicts engineer and philanthropist Howard Hughes's struggles with obsessive–compulsive disorder (OCD). Schwartz advised actor Leonardo DiCaprio and director Martin Scorsese on their portrayal of OCD.

== Views ==
Schwartz is a proponent of intelligent design, stating: "You can't get the intelligence out of nature. Intelligence is an intrinsic part of nature." In 2001, he signed the statement "A Scientific Dissent from Darwinism", which expressed skepticism about the ability of random mutations and natural selection to account for the complexity of life, and encourages careful examination of the evidence for "Darwinism", a term intelligent design proponents use to refer to evolution. He appeared in the controversial 2008 film Expelled: No Intelligence Allowed.

Schwartz is an advocate for mind–body dualism, arguing that consciousness exists entirely separately from the brain. He provided neuroplasticity from therapy as evidence that "the mind can exert control over the brain, which [he believes] challenges the material concept of the mind". He also theorized that in sports, when an athlete focuses, they are "making a connection with something deep within nature itself, which lends itself to deepening our intelligence."

Other scientists have been critical of Schwartz's ideas. The Templeton Foundation rejected a grant proposed by him; the foundation's senior vice president, Charles L. Harper Jr., stated that the proposal "had to do with a lot of hocus-pocus on quantum mechanics".

== Selected publications ==
=== Books ===
- Jeffrey Schwartz and Beverly Beyette, Brain Lock: Free Yourself from Obsessive-Compulsive Behavior, New York: Regan Books, 1997. ISBN 0-06-098711-1.
- Jeffrey Schwartz and Sharon Begley, The Mind and the Brain: Neuroplasticity and the power of mental force, New York: Regan Books, 2002. ISBN 0-06-039355-6.
- Jeffrey Schwartz, You Are Not Your Brain: The 4-Step Solution for Changing Bad Habits, Ending Unhealthy Thinking, and Taking Control of Your Life, New York: Avery, 2011. ISBN 1-58333-426-2.

=== Articles ===
- Schwartz, J. M., Stapp, H. P., and Beauregard, M. (2004). The volitional influence of the mind on the brain, with special reference to emotional self-regulation, in Beauregard, M. (Ed.), Consciousness, emotional self-regulation, and the brain, Philadelphia, PA: John Benjamins Publishing Company, chapter 7. ISBN 90-272-5187-8.
- Schwartz, J. M., Stapp, H. P., and Beauregard, M. (2005). Quantum physics in neuroscience and psychology: A neurophysical model of mind-brain interaction. Philosophical Transactions of the Royal Society of London, Series B, 360(1458):1309-27. Full paper
- Schwartz, J. M., Gulliford, E. Z., Stier, J., and Thienemann, M. (2005). Mindful Awareness and Self-Directed Neuroplasticity: Integrating psychospiritual and biological approaches to mental health with a focus on obsessive compulsive disorder, in Mijares, S. G., and Khalsa, G. S. (Eds.), The Psychospiritual Clinician's Handbook: Alternative methods for understanding and treating mental disorders, Binghamton, NY: Haworth Reference Press, chapter 13. ISBN 0-7890-2324-5.
