= B. Alan Wallace =

American author and Tibetan Buddhism expert

Bruce Alan Wallace
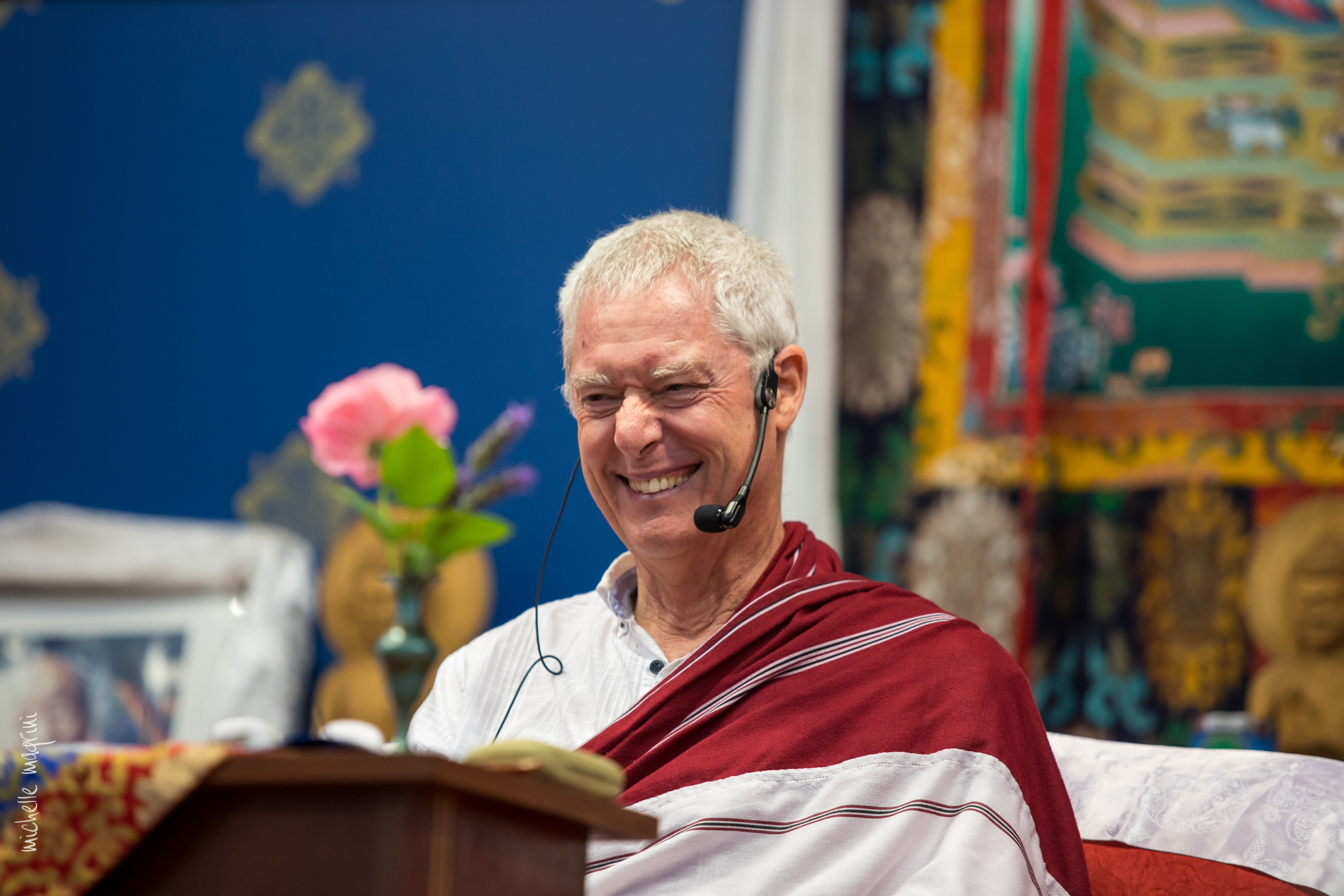
- Born: 1950 (age 75–76); Pasadena, California
- Other names: B. Alan Wallace, Allan Wallace
- Education: Amherst College (BS); Stanford University (MA), (PhD)
- Occupations: Author, Tibetan Buddhist Expert

Bruce Alan Wallace (born 1950) is an American Buddhologist of Tibetan Buddhism. He has authored many texts in the field of contemplative science, most notably The Attention Revolution on the cultivation of Samatha, and Dreaming Yourself Awake on the lucid dreaming practice of dream yoga. Wallace's works include an English translation of the foremost Tibetan Buddhism text, the Bardo Thodol, by Padmasambhava. He has also been active in the dialogue between established Western science and Tibetan Buddhist psychology, including staunch critiques of materialistic philosophies of mind, while emphasizing the incorporation of introspection as a technique of academic inquiry. He is founder of the Santa Barbara Institute for Consciousness Studies. Alan Wallace is widely regarded as a preeminent meditation teacher and Buddhism scholar.

== Early life and education ==
Wallace was born into a family of devout Christians. His father was a Baptist Theologian. At 13 he developed a passion for science, specifically in ecology, inspired by a science teacher. At 18 he matriculated at the University of California, San Diego. Wallace began his studies of the Tibetan language and Buddhism in 1970 at the University of Göttingen in Germany, continuing his studies in Dharamsala, India, where he was ordained as a Buddhist monk by the Dalai Lama in 1975.

Wallace continued his studies and began teaching at the Institute for Higher Tibetan Studies in Mont Pèlerin, Switzerland from 1975 to 1979 and then devoted four years to full-time meditation. He was a participant and interpreter at the first Mind and Life Institute in 1987 and continued in this capacity through 2009.

In 1987, Wallace obtained a B.A. in physics, philosophy of science and Sanskrit from Amherst College, followed in 1995 by a Ph.D. in religious studies from Stanford University. His doctoral dissertation was on The Cultivation of Sustained Voluntary Attention in Indo-Tibetan Buddhism.

== Career ==
Alan Wallace lectured for four years at the University of California at Santa Barbara in the Department of Religious Studies.

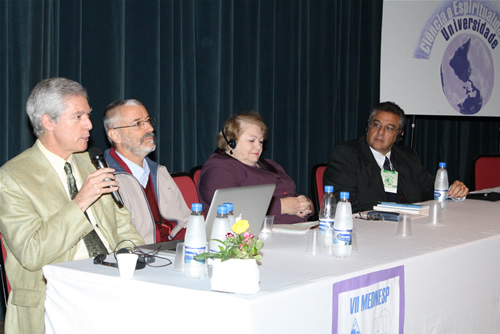
B. Alan Wallace, Padma Samten, Marlene Rossi Severino Nobre, and Roberto Lúcio Vieira de Souza, Universidade Federal do Rio Grande do Sul, 2009

Wallace founded the Santa Barbara Institute for Consciousness Studies in 2003, designed to integrate scientific and contemplative exploration of consciousness. Wallace and Clifford Saron established the shamatha project, which tested the effects of Buddhist meditation on 60 people engaged in a residential meditation retreat for 3 months, with Wallace serving as their instructor and Saron as the Principal Investigator for the scientific study. Research findings have been published in many peer-reviewed scientific journals regarding the effect on attention, emotions and well-being, and biomarkers.

Since 1976, Wallace has taught a wide range of Buddhist meditations worldwide and has served as interpreter for many eminent Tibetan lamas, including Dalai Lama in the interface between traditional forms of Buddhist meditation and the mind sciences. Beginning in 2010, Wallace has led a series of 8-week retreats to train students in the meditative practices of shamatha, the four immeasurables, vipashyana, and Dzogchen. Wallace is the motivating force behind the development of the Center for Contemplative Research in Tuscany, Italy, as a community of contemplatives and scientists, to integrate first-person meditative experience with third-person methods of science.

Wallace has also advocated the integration of contemplative study into America's higher education system. He references psychologist William James who said that an education that improved the individual's ability to maintain sustained, voluntary attention would be "the education par excellence."

== Selected works ==
=== Books on Buddhism and Science ===
- Meditations of a Buddhist Skeptic: A Manifesto for the Mind Sciences and Contemplative Practice, New York: Columbia University Press, 2011
- Mind in the Balance: Meditation in Science, Buddhism, and Christianity. New York: Columbia University Press, 2009 (Also published in Portuguese, Italian, Spanish, Dutch, and Tibetan translations)
- Embracing Mind: The Common Ground of Science and Spirituality. Co-authored with Brian Hodel. Boston: Shambhala Publications, 2008 (Also published in Dutch and Spanish translations)
- Hidden Dimensions: The Unification of Physics and Consciousness. New York: Columbia University Press, 2007 (Also published in Dutch, German, Italian, Portuguese, and Tibetan translations)
- Contemplative Science: Where Buddhism and Neuroscience Converge. New York: Columbia University Press, 2007 (Also published in Portuguese, Korean, and Thai translations)
- Buddhism and Science: Breaking New Ground. Edited by B. Alan Wallace. New York: Columbia University Press, 2003
- The Taboo of Subjectivity: Toward a New Science of Consciousness. New York: Oxford University Press, 2000
- Consciousness at the Crossroads: Conversations with the Dalai Lama on Brain-science and Buddhism. Edited by B. Alan Wallace, Zara Houshmand & Robert B. Livingston. Ithaca: Snow Lion, 1999 (Also published in Dutch, Portuguese, Korean, Spanish, French, Chinese, Italian translations)
- Choosing Reality: A Buddhist View of Physics and the Mind. Revised edition. Ithaca: Snow Lion Publications, 1996. Re-edition of Choosing Reality: A Contemplative View of Physics and the Mind. Boston: Shambhala Publications, 1989 (Also published in French and Korean translations)

=== Books on Tibetan Buddhism ===
- Fathoming the Mind: Inquiry and Insight in Dudjom Lingpa's Vajra Essence. Boston: Wisdom Publications 2018
- Open Mind: View and Meditation in the Lineage of Lerab Lingpa, Boston: Wisdom Publications 2017
- Dudjom Lingpa's Visions of the Great Perfection, Volumes 1–3, Boston: Wisdom Publications 2015
- Dreaming Yourself Awake: Lucid Dreaming and Tibetan Dream Yoga for Insight and Transformation, Boston: Shambhala Publications, 2012 (Also published in Portuguese)
- Stilling the Mind: Shamatha Teachings from Dudjom Lingpa's Vajra Essence, Boston: Wisdom Publications, 2011 (Also published in Portuguese)
- Minding Closely: The Four Applications of Mindfulness, Ithaca, NY: Snow Lion Publications, 2011
- The Attention Revolution: Unlocking the Power of the Focused Mind. Foreword by Daniel Goleman. Boston: Wisdom Publications, 2006 (Also published in Complex Chinese, Catalan, Italian, German, Indonesian, Portuguese, Romanian, Chinese, Spanish, and Mongolian translations)
- Genuine Happiness: Meditation as a Path to Fulfillment. Hoboken, NJ: John Wiley & Sons, 2005 (Also published in Spanish, Portuguese and Russian translations)
- Natural Liberation: Padmasambhava's Teachings on the Six Bardos (English translation). Boston: Wisdom Publications 1998
- Buddhism with an Attitude: The Tibetan Seven-Point Mind-Training. Ithaca, NY: Snow Lion Publications, 2001 (Also published in Dutch, Italian, Finnish, Spanish, Portuguese, and Korean translations)
- The Four Immeasurables: Practices to Open the Heart. Ithaca, NY: Snow Lion Publications, 2010. Re-edition of The Four Immeasurables: Cultivating a Boundless Heart, 2004; re-edition of Boundless Heart: The Four Immeasurables, 1999 (Also published in Italian, French, and Dutch translations)
- Balancing the Mind: A Tibetan Buddhist Approach to Refining Attention. Ithaca, NY: Snow Lion Publications, 2005. New edition of The Bridge of Quiescence: Experiencing Tibetan Buddhist Meditation. Chicago: Open Court Press, 1998
- Tibetan Buddhism From the Ground Up. Boston: Wisdom Publications, 1993 (Also published in Italian, Portuguese, Dutch, and Korean translations)
- The Seven-Point Mind Training. Ithaca, NY: Snow Lion Publications, 2004. Re-edition of A Passage from Solitude: A Modern Commentary on Tibetan Buddhist Mind Training. Ithaca, NY: Snow Lion Publications, 1992 (Also published in Italian translation)
- Tibetan Tradition of Mental Development. Geshe Ngawang Dhargyey. Sherpa Tulku, trans. Dharamsala: Library of Tibetan Works & Archives, 1974, 1976, 1978; rev. eds. 1985 & 1992 (Also published in Italian translation)
- Spoken Tibetan. Co-authored with Kerrith McKenzie. Mt. Pèlerin, Switzerland: Center for Higher Tibetan Studies, 1985

=== Translations ===
- Healing from the Source: The Science and Lore of Tibetan Medicine (2000), Yeshi Dhonden, ISBN 978-1559391481
- The Ambrosia of Heart Tantra (2006), Yeshi Dhonden, ISBN 978-8185102924

== See also ==
- Dzogchen
- Lojong
- Neurophenomenology
- Samatha
- Tibetan Buddhism
