= Robert Livingston (scientist) =

American neuroscientist (1918–2002)

Robert Burr "Bob" Livingston
- Born: October 9, 1918; Boston, Massachusetts, United States
- Died: April 26, 2002 (aged 83); San Diego, California, US
- Education: Stanford University; Stanford University School of Medicine
- Years active: 1944–1989
- Known for: Computer Mapping of the Brain; Antinuclear Activism
- Parent(s): William Livingston, MD; Ruth Livingston

Robert Burr Livingston (October 9, 1918 – April 26, 2002) was an American physician, neuroscientist, and social activist.

== Early life ==
Livingston was born on October 9, 1918, in Boston. He completed his undergraduate studies (in 1940), medical degree (in 1944), and residency at Stanford University.

== Career ==
As a Naval Reserve officer, Livingston served in Okinawa and earned a Bronze Star during World War II. His experience as a physician in a United States Navy hospital during the Atomic bombings of Hiroshima and Nagasaki lead him to a lifelong opposition to nuclear arms. He was co-founder and President of the San Diego chapter of Physicians for Social Responsibility. After the war he joined the Yale University college of medicine as a professor of physiology. He served on the faculty of the University of California, Los Angeles from 1952 to 1960. In other teaching appointments at Stanford and Harvard he also taught pathology, anatomy, and psychiatry. In the 1950s he served as physician to a Scripps Institution of Oceanography expedition. He was appointed Scientific Director of the National Institute of Mental Health and the National Institute of Neurological Diseases and Blindness during the Eisenhower and Kennedy administrations. He advised James Humes, the navy pathologist who performed the autopsy on John F. Kennedy, and based on his personal experience and observations became a skeptic of the "Lone gunman theory".

After his time at the National Institutes of Health, in 1964 Livingston founded the neuroscience department, the first of its kind in the world, at the newly built University of California, San Diego campus. He served as chairman of the department until 1970, as professor until 1989, and as professor emeritus until his death in 2002. His best known research was in the computer mapping and imaging of the human brain. His interest in the brain also extended to questions of cognition, consciousness, emotions, and spirituality. He was active in the International Physicians for the Prevention of Nuclear War, which won the Nobel Peace Prize in 1985. In 1988 Livingston met and befriended the Dalai Lama, for whom he served as a science advisor. He died in 2002 at the Thornton Hospital in San Diego, California.

Livingston was an avid mountain climbing and hiking friend of Robert S. McNamara.

== Publications ==
- Zara Houshmand; Robert B. Livingston & B. Alan Wallace (1999). Conversations With the Dalai Lama on Brain Science and Buddhism. Snow Lion Publications. ISBN 978-1-55939-127-6.
- Sensory Processing, Perception and Behavior
