= Pier Luigi Luisi =

Italian chemist and academic (1938–2025)

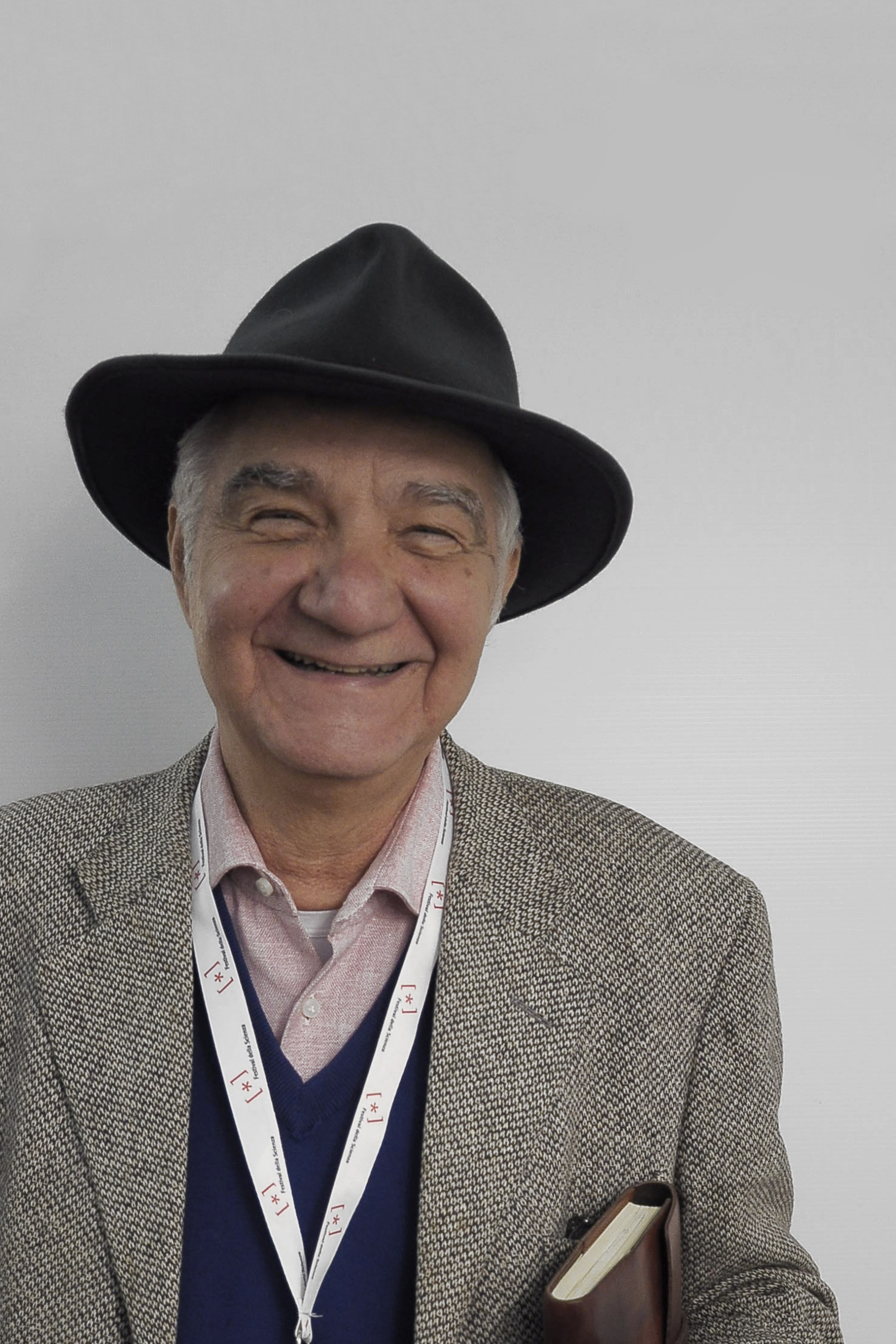
- Born: 23 May 1938
- Died: 26 August 2025 (aged 87)
- Education: Scuola Normale Superiore di Pisa
- Scientific career
- Fields: Chemistry; biochemistry
- Institutions: Roma Tre University; ETH Zurich

Pier Luigi Luisi (23 May 1938 – 26 August 2025) was an Italian chemist and academic. He received the title of professor emeritus from the Swiss Federal Institute of Technology (ETHZ). Luisi worked there as a scientist from 1970 until 2003, and as a Professor of Chemistry from 1980 until he departed. He then moved to the Roma Tre University as a Professor of Biochemistry, where he worked until 2015.

In 1985, Luisi founded the Cortona Week, an international summer school.

== Biography ==
He graduated in 1963 from the University of Pisa as a student of the Scuola Normale Superiore di Pisa. He worked in Pisa, Leningrad, and the United States. In 1970, he joined the Institute for Polymers at ETH Zurich (Swiss Federal Institute of Technology) in Zurich.

In 1985, he founded the Cortona International Week - “Science and the Wholeness of Life” - dedicated to the integration of scientific and humanistic disciplines.

He was particularly interested in prebiotic evolution and the mechanisms of formation of the first vital structures.

He collaborated with the Mind & Life Institute.

From 2006, he taught biology courses as a permanent collaborator at Roma Tre University, and in 2015, he began writing monthly articles for Wall Street International magazine.

== Books ==
- The Systems View of Life: A Unifying Vision (with Fritjof Capra) Cambridge University Press, 2014, translated in several languages. The Italian edition was published by Aboca, 2014, under the title Vita e Natura - Una visione sistemica.
- The Emergence of Life: From Chemical Origins to Synthetic Biology Cambridge University Press, second edition 2016
- Giant Vesicles (Perspectives in Supramolecular Chemistry) (with Peter Walde)
- Mind and life: discussions with the Dalai Lama on the nature of reality, Columbia University Press, 2009, ISBN 0-231-14550-0, ISBN 978-0-231-14550-3
