= Richard Davidson =

American psychologist

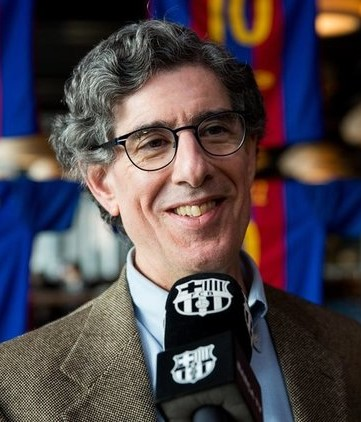
- Born: December 12, 1951 (age 74); Brooklyn, New York, U.S.
- Education: New York University; Harvard University
- Known for: Neurological effects of meditation
- Scientific career
- Fields: Neuroscience, psychology
- Workplaces: University of Wisconsin–Madison

Richard J. Davidson (born December 12, 1951) is an American psychologist and professor of psychology and psychiatry at the University of Wisconsin–Madison as well as founder and chair of the Center for Healthy Minds and the affiliated non-profit Healthy Minds Innovations.

== Early life and education ==
Born to a Jewish family in Brooklyn, Davidson attended Midwood High School. While there, between 1968–1971, he worked as a summer research assistant in the sleep laboratory at nearby Maimonides Medical Center cleaning electrodes that had been affixed to subjects' bodies for sleep studies.

Davidson went on to receive his B.A. in Psychology from NYU (Heights) in 1972. and studied at Harvard University to work with Daniel Goleman and Gary Schwartz and gained his Ph.D. in Personality, Psychopathology, and Psychophysiology there in 1976. At Harvard, Davidson was mentored by David C. McClelland and was also influenced by Norman Geschwind and Walle J. H. Nauta.

== Career ==
In 1976 Davidson took a teaching post at the State University of New York at Purchase where he subsequently held several posts including research consultancies at the Department of Pediatrics, Infant Laboratory, Roosevelt Hospital, New York and the Laboratory of Neurosciences, National Institute on Aging, NIH.

In 1984 he joined the faculty of the University of Wisconsin at Madison where he has since remained. He previously served as the director of the Laboratory for Affective Neuroscience and of the Waisman Laboratory for Brain Imaging and Behavior. He is the founder and director of the Center for Healthy Minds.

== Research ==
Davidson's research is broadly focused on the neural bases of emotion and emotional style as well as methods to promote human flourishing, including meditation and related contemplative practices. His studies have centered on people across their lifespans, from birth through old age. In addition, he has conducted studies with individuals with emotional disorders such as mood and anxiety disorders and autism, as well as expert meditation practitioners with tens of thousands of hours of experience. His research uses a wide range of methods including different varieties of MRI, positron emission tomography, electroencephalography, and modern genetic and epigenetic methods.

Richard Davidson is popularizing the idea that based on what is known about the plasticity of the brain, neuroplasticity, one can learn happiness and compassion as skills just as one learns to play a musical instrument or train in golf or tennis. Happiness, like any skill, requires practice and time but because one knows that the brain is built to change in response to mental training, it is possible to train a mind to be happy.

Davidson argues for a diagnosis of clinical depression with the help of emotional style. He describes emotional style as a set of continuums where some people fall at one extreme of the continuum while others fall somewhere in the middle. Clinical depression manifests as extremes on the outlook and resilience dimensions, where those afflicted have a more negative outlook and are slower to recover from adversity.

Richard Davidson and his collaborators have used rhesus monkeys as models of human neurophysiology and emotional response since 1992 when he and fellow UW–Madison researchers Ned H. Kalin and Steven E. Shelton published "Lateralized effects of diazepam on frontal brain electrical asymmetries in rhesus monkeys." In 2004 the same group published further results on the role of the central nucleus of the amygdala in mediating fear and anxiety in the primate. In 2007, Drs Kalin, Shelton & Davidson reported that experimental lesions of adolescent rhesus monkeys' orbitofrontal cortex resulted in "significantly decreased threat-induced freezing and marginally decreased fearful responses to a snake."

Davidson's work with human subjects has attracted the attention of both scientific and popular press, and has been covered by Scientific American and The New York Times.

=== Use of Primates ===
Davidson's has been involved in research that use rhesus macaques to study anxiety, which has led to some controversy and criticism. Davidson has stated that he supports animal research and that it has "undeniably made major contributions to the reduction of suffering" in humans.

=== Research with the Dalai Lama ===
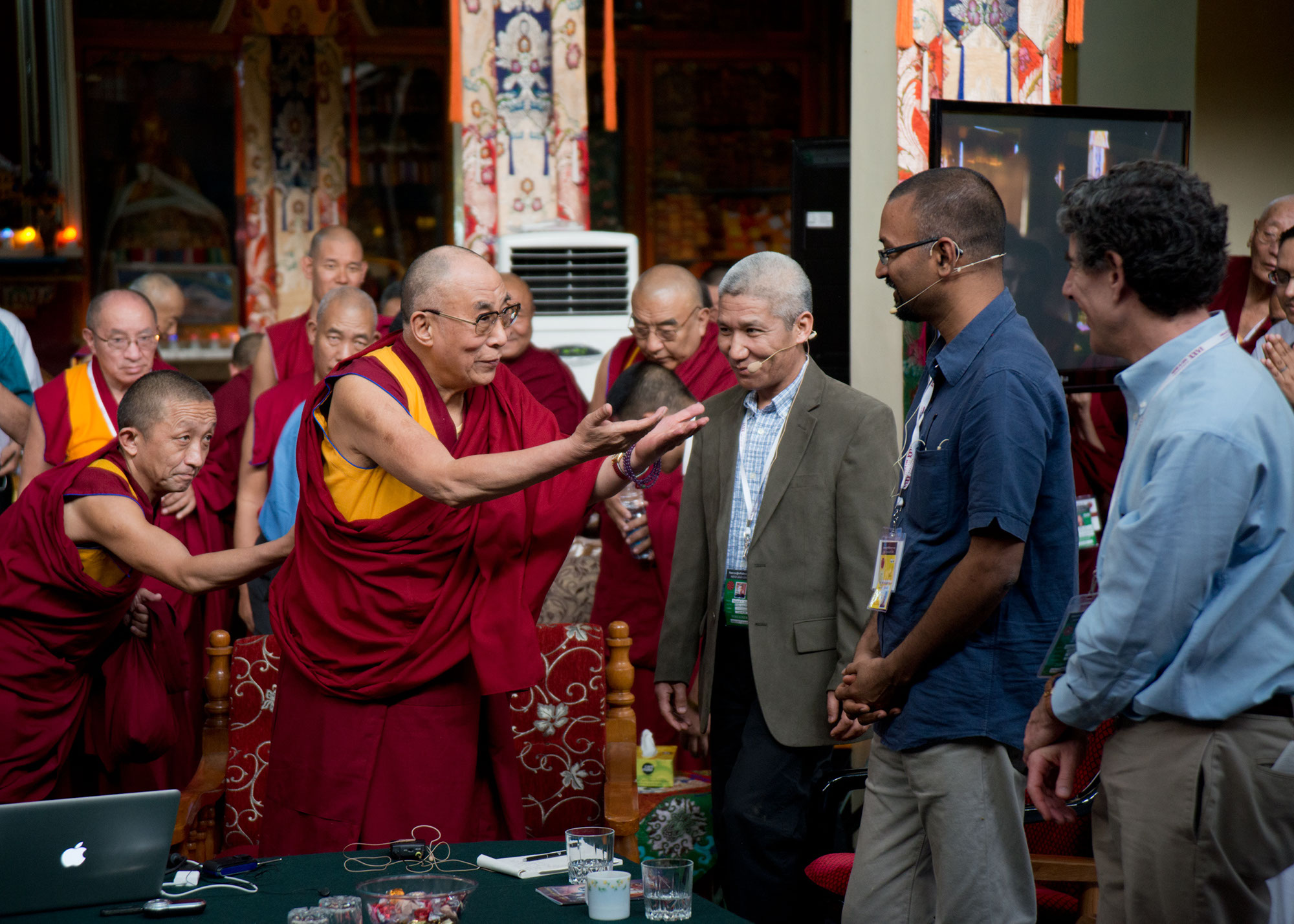
Rajesh Kasturirangan with the 14th Dalai Lama, Geshe Thupten Jinpa and Richard Davidson at Mind and Life Institute XXVI conference, 2013

Davidson has been a longtime friend of the 14th Dalai Lama, and some of his work involves research on the brain as it relates to meditation. Davidson has long maintained his own daily meditation practice, and continues to communicate regularly with the Dalai Lama.

This connection has caused controversy, with some scientists criticizing Davidson for being too close to someone with an interest in the outcome of his research and others claiming that it represents an inappropriate mix of faith and science. When he invited the Dalai Lama to participate in the "Neuroscience and Society" program of the Society for Neuroscience meeting in 2005, over 500 researchers signed a petition in protest. Some of the petitioners were Chinese researchers, who may disagree politically with the Dalai Lama's stance on Tibet. The controversy subsided quickly after most scientists attending the talk found it appropriate.

== Awards and honors ==
In 2000, Davidson received the Distinguished Scientific Contribution Award, for lifetime achievement from the American Psychological Association.

Time magazine named Dr. Davidson one of the world's top 100 most influential people in a 2006 issue.

== Personal meditation practice ==
Davidson's practice has changed considerably over the years. In recent years he practices in the Tibetan Buddhist tradition, including prostration to the teachings, and meditating "not primarily for my benefit, but for the benefit of others."

== Publications ==
Davidson has published many papers, chapter articles and edited 13 books. In 2001 he was the founding co-editor, with Klaus Scherer, of the American Psychological Association journal Emotion.

Davidson is currently on the Editorial Board of Greater Good Magazine, published by the Greater Good Science Center of the University of California, Berkeley. Dr. Davidson's contributions include the interpretation of scientific research into the roots of compassion, altruism, and peaceful human relationships.

His most recent book, Born to Flourish: How New Science and Ancient Wisdom Reveal a Simple Path to Thriving, was co-authored with friend and colleague Cortland Dahl and released in March 2026.

He has written a New York Times bestseller (with Sharon Begley) titled The Emotional Life of Your Brain, published by Penguin in March 2012.

A documentary film about the work of Davidson called "Free The Mind", directed by Phie Ambo, was released in 2012.

=== Selected publications ===
==== Papers ====
- Davidson, R.; Lutz, A. (2008). "Buddha's Brain: Neuroplasticity and Meditation [In the Spotlight]". IEEE Signal Processing Magazine. 25 (1): 176–174. Bibcode:2008ISPM...25..176D. doi:10.1109/MSP.2008.4431873. PMC 2944261. PMID 20871742.
- Kern, S.; Oakes, T. R.; Stone, C. K.; McAuliff, E. M.; Kirschbaum, C.; Davidson, R. J. (2008). "Glucose metabolic changes in the prefrontal cortex are associated with HPA axis response to a psychosocial stressor". Psychoneuroendocrinology. 33 (4): 517–529. doi:10.1016/j.psyneuen.2008.01.010. PMC 2601562. PMID 18337016.
- Lutz, A.; Brefczynski-Lewis, J.; Johnstone, T.; Davidson, R. J. (2008). Baune, Bernhard (ed.). "Regulation of the Neural Circuitry of Emotion by Compassion Meditation: Effects of Meditative Expertise". PLOS ONE. 3 (3) e1897. Bibcode:2008PLoSO...3.1897L. doi:10.1371/journal.pone.0001897. PMC 2267490. PMID 18365029.
- Lutz, A.; Slagter, H. A.; Dunne, J. D.; Davidson, R. J. (2008). "Attention regulation and monitoring in meditation". Trends in Cognitive Sciences. 12 (4): 163–169. doi:10.1016/j.tics.2008.01.005. PMC 2693206. PMID 18329323.
- Slagter, H. A.; Lutz, A.; Greischar, L. L.; Francis, A. D.; Nieuwenhuis, S.; Davis, J. M.; Davidson, R. J. (2007). "Mental Training Affects Distribution of Limited Brain Resources". PLOS Biology. 5 (6) e138. doi:10.1371/journal.pbio.0050138. PMC 1865565. PMID 17488185.
- Davidson, R. J. (2004). "Well-being and affective style: Neural substrates and biobehavioural correlates". Philosophical Transactions of the Royal Society B: Biological Sciences. 359 (1449): 1395–1411. doi:10.1098/rstb.2004.1510. PMC 1693421. PMID 15347531.
- Davidson, R. J.; Kabat-Zinn, J.; Schumacher, J.; Rosenkranz, M.; Muller, D.; Santorelli, S.; Urbanowski, F.; Harrington, A.; Bonus, K.; Sheridan, J. F. (2003). "Alterations in Brain and Immune Function Produced by Mindfulness Meditation". Psychosomatic Medicine. 65 (4): 564–570. doi:10.1097/01.PSY.0000077505.67574.E3. PMID 12883106. S2CID 1398878.

==== Books ====
- Goleman, Daniel; Davidson, Richard J., eds. (1 Jan 1979). Consciousness, the Brain, States of Awareness, and Alternate Realities. Ardent Media. p. 228. ISBN 978-0-89197-648-6.
- Fox, Nathan A.; Davidson, Richard J., eds. (April 1, 1984). Psychobiology of Affective Development. Psychology Press. p. 424. ISBN 978-0-89859-269-6.
- Ekman, Paul; Davidson, Richard J., eds. (December 22, 1994). The Nature of Emotion: Fundamental Questions. New York: Oxford University Press. p. 512. ISBN 978-0-19-508944-8.
- Davidson, Richard J., ed. (July 15, 2000). Anxiety, Depression, and Emotion. New York: Oxford University Press. p. 306. ISBN 978-0-19-513358-5.
- Davidson, Richard J.; Harrington, Anne, eds. (December 6, 2001). Visions of Compassion: Western Scientists and Tibetan Buddhists Examine Human Nature. New York: Oxford University Press. p. 288. ISBN 978-0-19-513043-0.
- Hugdahi, Kenneth; Davidson, Richard J., eds. (December 13, 2002). The Asymmetrical Brain. Cambridge, MA: The MIT Press. pp. 732. ISBN 978-0-262-08309-6.
- Davidson, Richard J.; Begley, Sharon (December 24, 2012). The Emotional Life of Your Brain: How its Unique Patterns Affect the Way You Think, Feel, and Live — and How You Can Change Them. London: Penguin Books. p. 304. ISBN 978-0-452-29888-0.
- Goleman, Daniel; Davidson, Richard J. (September 5, 2017). Altered Traits: Science Reveals How Meditation Changes Your Mind, Brain, and Body. Avery Publishing. p. 336. ISBN 978-0-399-18438-3.
- Davidson, Richard J.; Sutton, Caroline; Dahl, Cortland (2026). Born to flourish: how new science and ancient wisdom reveal a simple path to thriving. New York: Avid Reader Press. ISBN 978-1-6680-6623-2.
