= Brain activity and meditation =

Effects of meditation on brain activity

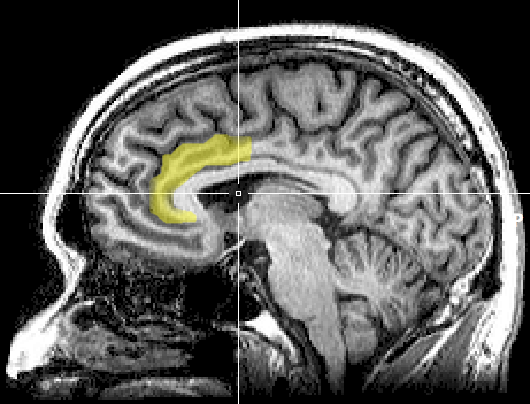
Highlighted region shows the anterior cingulate cortex, a region of the brain shown to be activated during meditation.

Meditation and its effect on brain activity and the central nervous system became a focus of collaborative research in neuroscience, psychology and neurobiology during the latter half of the 20th century. Research on meditation sought to define and characterize various practices. The effects of meditation on the brain can be broken up into two categories: state changes and trait changes, respectively alterations in brain activities during the act of meditating and changes that are the outcome of long-term practice.

Mindfulness meditation, a Buddhist meditation approach found in Zen and Vipassana, is frequently studied. Jon Kabat-Zinn describes mindfulness meditation as complete, unbiased attention to the current moment.

== Changes in brain state ==
=== Electroencephalography ===
Electroencephalography (EEG) has been used in many studies as a primary method for evaluating the meditating brain. Electroencephalography uses electrical leads placed all over the scalp to measure the collective electrical activity of the cerebral cortex. Specifically, EEG measures the electric fields of large groups of neurons. EEG has the benefit of excellent temporal resolution and is able to measure aggregate activity of portions or the entire cortex down to the millisecond scale. Unlike other imaging based methods, EEG does not have good spatial resolution and is more appropriately used to evaluate the running spontaneous activity of the cortex. This spontaneous activity is classified into four main classifications based on the frequency of the activity, ranging from low frequency delta waves (< 4 Hz) commonly found during sleep to beta waves (13–30 Hz) associated with an awake and alert brain. In between these two extremes are theta waves (4–8 Hz) and alpha waves (8–12 Hz).

Many studies on mindfulness meditation, assessed in a review by Cahn and Polich in 2006, have linked lower frequency alpha waves, as well as theta waves, to meditation. Much older studies report more specific findings, such as decreased alpha blocking and increased frontal lobe specific theta activity. Alpha blocking is a phenomenon where the active brain, normally presenting beta wave activity, cannot as easily switch to alpha wave activity often involved in memory recall. These findings would suggest that in a meditative state a person is more relaxed but maintains a sharp awareness. Two large, comprehensive review works, however, point to poor control and statistical analyses in these early studies and comment that it can only be said with confidence that increased alpha and theta wave activity exists.

A statue of Amitābha meditating.

=== Neuroimaging ===
Functional magnetic resonance imaging (fMRI) is another highly utilized methodology for studying state changes in meditating brains. fMRI detects subtle increases in blood flow to areas of the brain with higher metabolic activity. Thus these areas of increased metabolic activity indicate which regions of the brain are currently being used to process whatever stimuli presented. Counter to EEG, the advantage of fMRI is its spatial resolution, with the ability to produce detailed spatial maps of brain activity. It suffers, however, in temporal resolution and cannot measure progressive activity, like the EEG, with much detail.

==== Topographical findings ====
As a relatively new technology, fMRI has only recently been used to assess brain state changes during meditation. Studies have shown heightened activity in the anterior cingulate cortex, frontal cortex, and prefrontal cortex, specifically in the dorsal medial prefrontal area during Vipassana meditation. Similarly, the cingulate cortex and frontal cortex areas were shown to have increased activity during Zen meditation. Both studies comment on the possibility that these findings could indicate some state of heightened voluntary control over attention during mindfulness meditation. Review works by Cahn and Chiesa state that these results indicate consistency in meditation's effect on these regions of the brain, citing a multitude of other studies spanning other meditative disciplines, but mention the need for further investigation with better controls.

==== Study on meditation and emotion ====
The review by Cahn also notes findings describing a heightened emotional state of meditators. A more complex study, conducted in 2008 by Lutz et al., focused on emotional response during meditation. This investigation involved the creation of a "compassion meditation" state by novice and experienced meditators and testing the meditators response to emotionally charged sounds. fMRI results indicated heightened activity in the cingulate cortex but also in the amygdala, temporo-parietal junction, and right posterior superior temporal sulcus in response to the emotional sounds. The authors of this study believe this indicates greater sensitivity to emotional expression and positive emotion due to the neural circuitry activated.

== Changes in brain due to the prolonged practice ==
=== Electroencephalography ===
Similar to research into state changes in brain function, older studies make more specific claims about trait changes in meditators versus non-meditators. Changes to the alpha wave were indicated to be a trait, as well as state and phenomena. Studies have reported an increase in the specific frequencies expressed in the alpha range, increased alpha band power, and an overall slowing (reduction in frequency) in EEG activity in experienced meditators versus less experienced meditators while meditating. The alpha blocking phenomenon, observed as a state change in brain function, was investigated as a possible trait change as well. One study that examined a variety of meditation techniques tried to show that alpha blocking was affected by the long term practice of meditation by testing response to auditory stimuli. Review works, however, comment on inconsistent findings as well as a lack of repeated results in this, and other studies. They further remark that, similar to observations in brain state changes, only general assertions can be made about brain trait changes: some change in the electroencephalographic profile exists but with some inconsistency. It is also important to note that these trait changes were observed during meditation, and although it does indicate that a practitioner's electroencephalographic profile is modified by the practice of meditation, these EEG studies have not yet shown changes in non-meditating brains, even of experienced meditators.

Red region of the brain shows the hippocampus which had been shown to have heightened activity during meditation by experienced meditators.

=== Neuroimaging ===
Brain trait changes have also been observed in neuroimaging studies, most often employing fMRI. In a meta-analysis of 21 neuroimaging studies, eight brain regions were found to be consistently altered, including areas key to meta-awareness (frontopolar cortex/Brodmann area 10), exteroceptive and interoceptive body awareness (sensory cortex and insular cortex), memory consolidation and reconsolidation (hippocampus), self and emotion regulation (anterior cingulate cortex and orbitofrontal cortex), and intra- and interhemispheric communication (superior longitudinal fasciculus; corpus callosum) These changes were distinguished by density increases in grey matter regions and white matter pathways in the brains of individuals who meditate in comparison to individuals who do not. Of all areas with reported findings, a greater number of structural changes were found in the left hemisphere.

There is also evidence to suggest meditation plays a protective role against the natural reduction in grey matter volume associated with aging. One study found evidence that Zen meditators experienced a slower age related decline rate for cerebral gray matter volume in the putamen which plays a role in learning, cognitive flexibility and attentional processing This could suggest a better attentiveness in aging meditators versus non-meditators.

Long-term meditation practitioners have also shown to have a higher tolerance for pain. This effect has been correlated to altered function and structure in somatosensory cortices and an increased ability to decouple regions in the brain associated with the cognitive appraisal of pain (anterior cingulate cortex and dorsolateral prefrontal cortex).

The brain state changes found in meditators are almost exclusively found in higher-order executive and association cortices. This supports the notion that meditation increases self-regulation and attentiveness. Recent studies have also investigated how these changes may alter the functionality and connectivity of the default mode network, which is a hypothesized network of brain regions that are active when an individual is engaged in internal tasks such as daydreaming. Similar brain activity has also been found when people listen to music, especially live music that adjusts to the listener, which can activate areas linked to emotion and attention such as the amygdala and prefrontal cortex.

=== Thalamic Neural Sorting ===
One study aimed to investigate whether meditation could potentially be a method of treatment for Major Depressive Disorder (MDD). Researchers were measuring thalamocortical functional connectivity (FC) in patients with Major Depressive Disorder. Each subregion of the thalamus was captured by MRIs both before and after a body-mind relaxation meditation (BMRM) session and compared for analysis regarding which regions were affected. The research concluded that there was a difference in functional connectivity in multiple parts of the thalamus routing to areas of the bilateral precuneus and the posterior cingulate cortex in both the Major Depressive Disorder and Healthy Controls (HC) group before and after the body-mind relaxation meditation session. Authors of the studies make the suggestion that the body-mind relaxation meditation could possibly improve a process known as sensory gating, which is a sorting mechanism of neural inputs in the thalamus.

=== Validity of findings ===
In the meta-analysis performed by Fox et al., several sources of bias were indicated which bring into question the validity of meditation studies which use neuroimaging. Fox et al. suggests a publication bias may be leading to the over-reporting of significant results. Despite this, however, Fox et al. found "consistent differences in prefrontal cortex and body awareness regions" in "areas key to meta-awareness..., exteroceptive and interoceptive body awareness..., memory consolidation and reconsolidation..., self and emotion regulation..., and intra- and interhemispheric communication..." and that changes were significant with "moderate" global median effect size and "consistent and medium-sized brain structure differences."

More research will be needed before any firm conclusions can be made.

== Popular literature ==
=== Positive portrayal ===
Besides scientific literature, some authors have written of the promising research on meditation in books targeted for general audiences. One such book, Buddha's Brain by Rick Hanson, PhD shares the current scientific research and investigations into meditation. Hanson, a neuroscientist and researcher, explains to readers the scientific studies in plain language and discuss the impact of the results. Hanson's main argument is that positive emotions, like love can be strengthened through meditation in a neuroplastic manner, citing dozens of scientific studies to support this claim. Hanson's viewpoint is representative of a larger popular movement to study and embrace Eastern phenomena including meditation in the Western world.

=== Criticism ===
Critics, like Owen Flanagan, PhD, believe that Hanson, and those like him, are overextending the results of current scientific studies. In his book Bodhisattva's Brain: Buddhism Naturalized, Flanagan presents a more conservative viewpoint of current scientific research and cautions readers against the seemingly exciting results of recent studies. Flanagan does not believe current science supports the idea that positive emotion can be strengthened in the same way that stroke victims can recover use of limbs with use. Flanagan does acknowledge that meditation may be beneficial in some way, but the mechanism of how meditation affects the brain is still clouded. Similarly, Awasthi argues that meditation is non-specific to the research studies showing clinical efficacy in some cases, though mechanisms remain unclear. Flanagan and Hanson use many of the same scientific studies to attempt to support their differing viewpoint, but both authors identify the need and importance of future studies investigating meditation. Meditation research is still in its early stages and a lot more replicable results need to be established before the science community can back its efficiency.

== See also ==
- Neural mechanisms of mindfulness meditation
- Effects of meditation
