= Daniel Goleman =

American author and science journalist (born 1946)

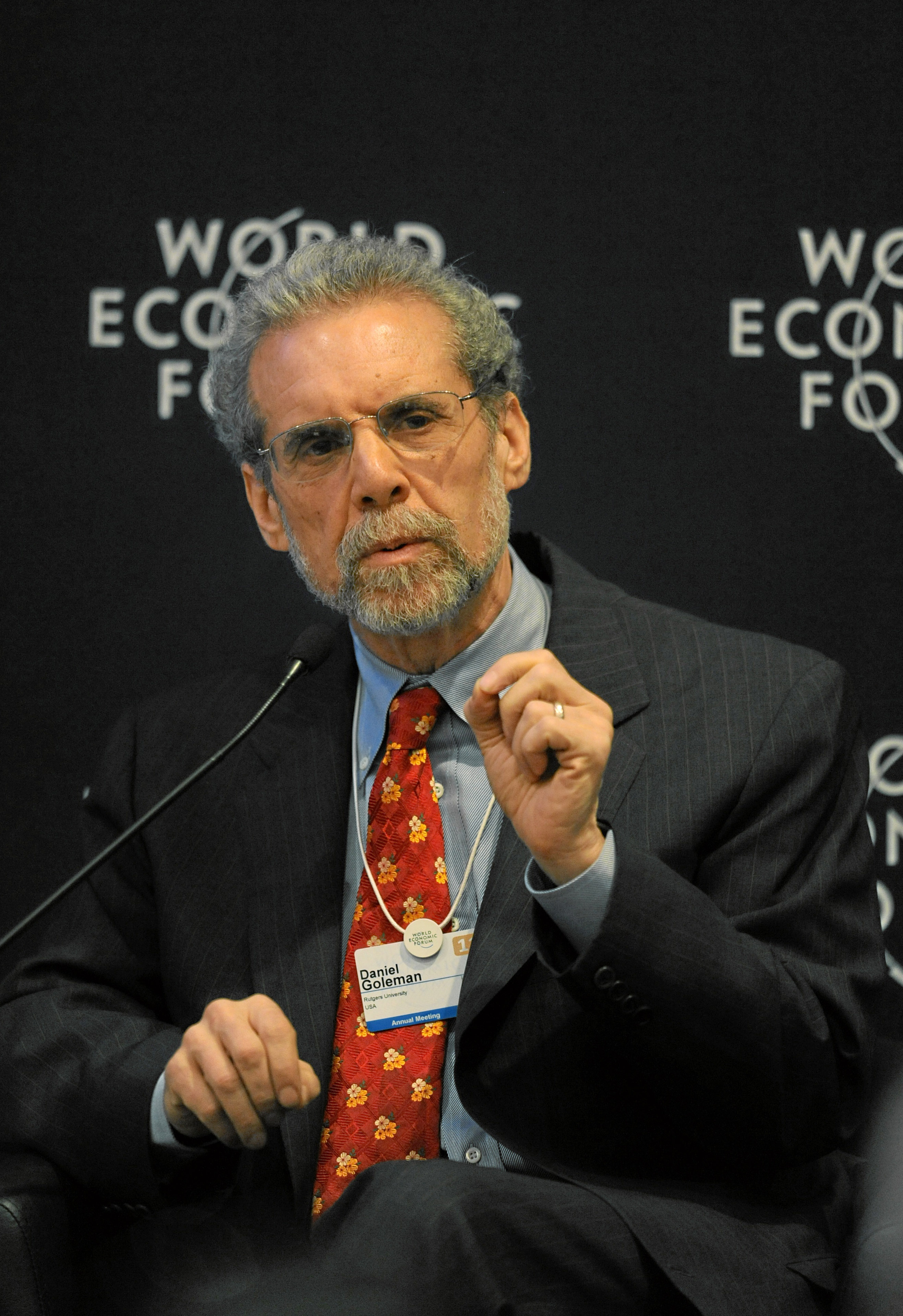
- Goleman at the 2011 WEF
- Born: March 7, 1946 (age 80); Stockton, California, U.S.
- Education: Amherst College (BA); Harvard University (PhD)
- Occupations: Psychologist; writer
- Spouse: Tara Bennett-Goleman
- Website: danielgoleman.info

Daniel Goleman (born March 7, 1946) is an American psychologist, author, and science journalist. For twelve years, he wrote for The New York Times, reporting on the brain and behavioral sciences. His 1995 book Emotional Intelligence was on The New York Times Best Seller list for a year and a half, a bestseller in many countries, and is in print worldwide in 40 languages. Apart from his books on emotional intelligence, Goleman has written books on topics including self-deception, creativity, transparency, meditation, social and emotional learning, ecoliteracy and the ecological crisis, and the Dalai Lama's vision for the future.

== Biography ==
Daniel Goleman grew up in a Jewish household in Stockton, California, the son of Fay Goleman (née Weinberg; 1910–2010), professor of sociology at the University of the Pacific, and Irving Goleman (1898–1961), humanities professor at Stockton College (now San Joaquin Delta College). His maternal uncle was nuclear physicist Alvin M. Weinberg.

Goleman attended Amherst College, graduating magna cum laude. He also attended the University of California at Berkeley through Amherst's Independent Scholar program. He went on to earn a Ph.D. in clinical psychology at Harvard University.

Goleman studied in India using a pre-doctoral fellowship from Harvard and a post-doctoral grant from the Social Science Research Council. While in India, he spent time with spiritual teacher Neem Karoli Baba, who was also the guru to Ram Dass, Krishna Das, and Larry Brilliant. He wrote his first book based on travel in India and Sri Lanka.

Goleman then returned as a visiting lecturer to Stanford, where during the 1970s his course on the psychology of consciousness was popular. David McClelland, his mentor at Harvard, recommended him for a job at Psychology Today, from which he was recruited by The New York Times in 1984.

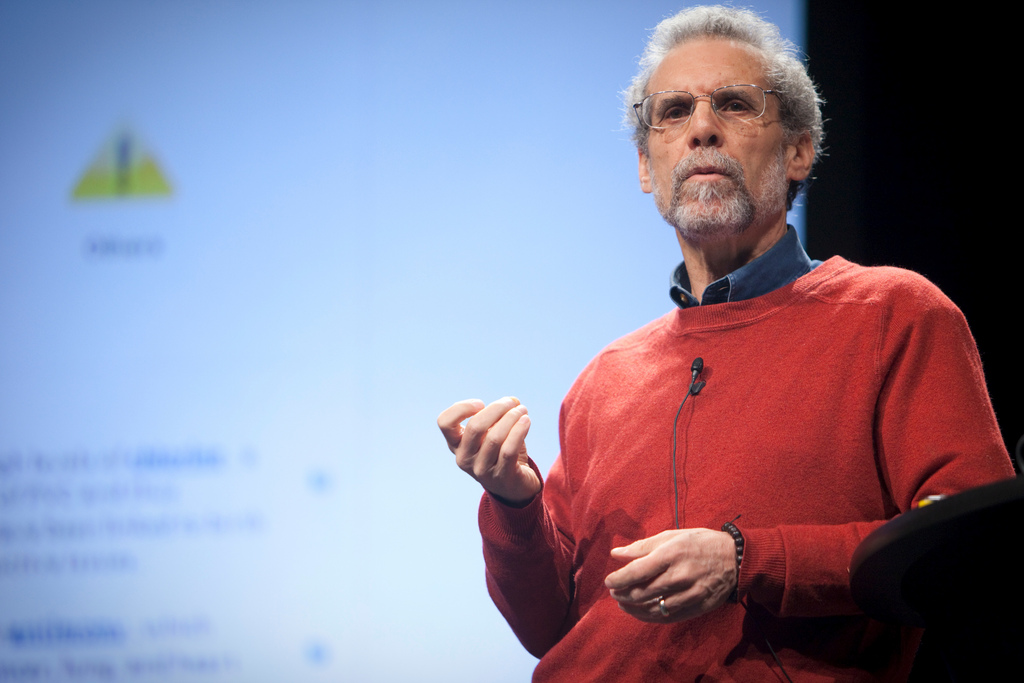
Daniel Goleman on 22 Oct 2009

In 1993 Goleman co-founded the Collaborative for Academic, Social, and Emotional Learning at Yale University's Child Studies Center, which then moved to the University of Illinois at Chicago. Collaborative for Academic, Social, and Emotional Learning (CASEL) the organization's mission is to introduce social and emotional learning into the education of students from preschool to high school. Social and emotional learning (SEL) entails the methods by which children and young adults develop and use the knowledge, attitudes, and abilities required to comprehend and regulate emotions, and accomplish constructive goals, empathize with others, form and sustain beneficial relationships, and make ethical choices. Goleman also co-founded Consortium for Research on Emotional Intelligence in Organizations (CREIO) in 1996. The organization is dedicated to enhancing the understanding and application of emotional and social intelligence within organizations by fostering the creation and sharing of knowledge. Currently he co-directs the Consortium for Research on Emotional Intelligence in Organizations at Rutgers University. He is on the board of the Mind & Life Institute.

== Career ==
Goleman was a science journalist at the New York Times until 1996, covering psychology, emotions, and the brain. He was twice nominated for the Pulitzer Prize for his work at the Times. While there, he wrote the book Emotional Intelligence (Bantam Books, 1995), which spent more than a year and a half on The New York Times Best Seller list.

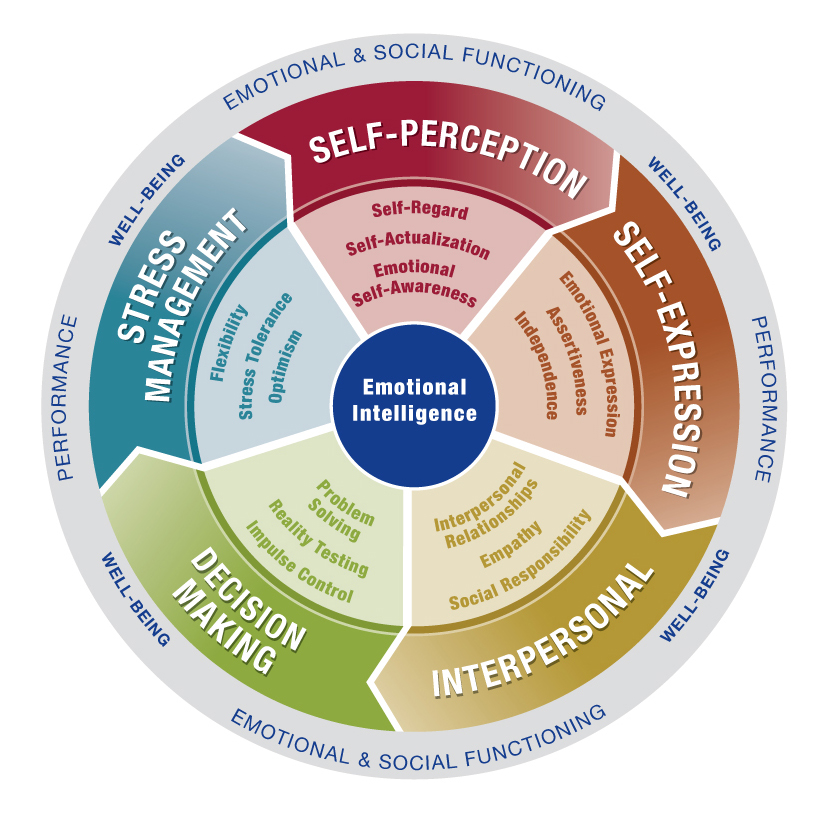
Emotional intelligence diagram, Daniel Goleman's model

Goleman gained widespread recognition for his contributions to the field of emotional intelligence, a notion that includes the abilities of self-awareness, managing one's own emotions, empathy, and social skills – essentially, how effectively we manage our emotions and understand the emotions of others. His book Emotional Intelligence has been translated into 40 languages globally and was celebrated by TIME magazine as one of the top 25 most pivotal books in the realm of business management.

In his first book, The Varieties of Meditative Experience (1977) (republished in 1988 as The Meditative Mind), Goleman describes almost a dozen different meditation systems. He wrote that "the need for the meditator to retrain his attention, whether through concentration or mindfulness, is the single invariant ingredient in the recipe for altering consciousness of every meditation system".

In Working with Emotional Intelligence (Bantam Books, 1998), Goleman developed the argument that non-cognitive skills can matter as much as IQ for workplace success, and made a similar argument for leadership effectiveness in Primal Leadership (Harvard Business School Press, 2001).

Goleman's book Focus: The Hidden Driver of Excellence was published in 2013. In it he discusses the success, and how mindfulness allows one to concentrate on what is important. Goleman explains that high achievers of mindfulness have mastered a "triple-focus," which encompasses three distinct types of attention: "inner," "other," and "outer." "Inner" focus is about self-awareness, "other" focus pertains to empathy, and "outer" focus involves an understanding of our surroundings. Goleman emphasizes that for business leaders, the practice of mindfulness is especially critical. The essence of leadership depends on the successful steering of the collective focus. This requires not only monitoring external developments relative to the organization but also engaging and guiding the focus of individuals both within and beyond the company's boundaries.

=== Awards ===
Goleman has received many awards, including:

- Career Achievement award for Excellence in the Media (1984) from the American Psychological Association.
- Fellow of the American Association for the Advancement of Science in recognition of his efforts to communicate the behavioral sciences to the public
- Washburn Award for Science Journalism in 1997
- Ranked 39th on the 2011 Thinkers50
- Centennial Medal from the Harvard Griffin Graduate School of Arts and Sciences in 2023

== Publishing history ==
=== Books ===
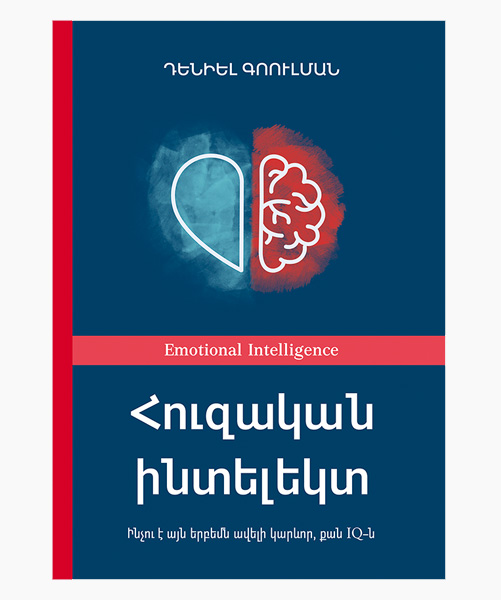
Armenian: Cover of the Armenian edition of the book 'Emotional Intelligence' on 5 Jul 2021

- 1977: The Varieties of the Meditative Experience, Irvington Publishers. ISBN 0-470-99191-7. Republished in 1988 as The Meditative Mind: The Varieties of Meditative Experience, Tarcher/Penguin. ISBN 978-0-87477-833-5
- 1985: Vital Lies, Simple Truths: The Psychology of Self-Deception, Bloomsbury Publishers. ISBN 0684831074
- 1988: The Meditative Mind: The Varieties of Meditative Experience. Tarcherperigee. ISBN 978-0-87477-833-5
- 1995: Emotional Intelligence: Why It Can Matter More Than IQ, Bantam Books. ISBN 978-0-553-38371-3
- 1997: Healing Emotions: Conversations with the Dalai Lama on Mindfulness, Emotions, and Health. Shambhala. ISBN 978-0-553-38105-4
- 1998: Harvard Business Review on What Makes a Leader? Co-authors: Michael MacCoby, Thomas Davenport, John C. Beck, Dan Clampa, Michael Watkins. Harvard Business School Press. ISBN 978-1-57851-637-7
- 1998: Working with Emotional Intelligence, Bantam Books. ISBN 978-1856135016
- 2001: The Emotionally Intelligent Workplace: How to Select for, Measure, and Improve Emotional Intelligence in Individuals, Groups, and Organizations. Jossey-Bass. ISBN 978-0-7879-5690-5
- 2002: Primal Leadership: Unleashing the Power of Emotional Intelligence, with Richard Boyatzis and Annie McKee, Harvard Business Review Press. ISBN 978-1578514861
- 2003: Destructive Emotions: A Scientific Dialogue with the Dalai Lama. Bantam Books. ISBN 978-0-553-38105-4
- 2006: Social Intelligence: The New Science of Human Relationships. Bantam Books. ISBN 978-0-553-80352-5
- 2009: Ecological Intelligence: The Hidden Impacts of What We Buy. Random House. ISBN 978-0-385-52782-8
- 2013: Focus: The Hidden Driver of Excellence, Harper Collins Publishers. ISBN 978-0062114969
- 2015: A Force for Good: The Dalai Lama's Vision for Our World, Bantam Books. ISBN 978-0553394894
- 2017: Altered Traits: Science Reveals How Meditation Changes Your Mind, Brain, and Body, with Richard Davidson, Avery. ISBN 978-0399184383
- 2019: The Emotionally Intelligent Leader, Harvard Business Review Press. ISBN 978-1-63369-733-1
- 2022: Why We Meditate: The Science and Practice of Clarity and Compassion, with Tsoknyi Rinpoche, Atria Books. ISBN 978-0241527870

=== Journal articles (selected) ===
- Miller, Dorothy H.; Goleman, Daniel J. (1970). "Predicting Post-Release Risk among Hospitalized Suicide Attempters". OMEGA: Journal of Death and Dying. 1 (1): 71–84. doi:10.2190/93R9-GXD6-7PX8-CYG4. S2CID 144464545.
- Adler, Nancy E.; Goleman, Daniel (1975). "Goal Setting, T-Group Participation, and Self-Rated Change: An Experimental Study". The Journal of Applied Behavioral Science. 11 (2): 197–208. doi:10.1177/002188637501100205. S2CID 143998258.
- Goleman, Daniel J.; Schwartz, Gary E. (1976). "Meditation as an intervention in stress reactivity". Journal of Consulting and Clinical Psychology. 44 (3): 456–466. doi:10.1037/0022-006X.44.3.456. PMID 777059.
- Goleman, Daniel (January 1976). "Meditation and Consciousness: An Asian Approach to Mental Health". American Journal of Psychotherapy. 30 (1): 41–54. doi:10.1176/appi.psychotherapy.1976.30.1.41. PMID 1259055.
- Davidson, Richard J.; Goleman, Daniel J.; Schwartz, Gary E. (1976). "Attentional and affective concomitants of meditation: A cross-sectional study". Journal of Abnormal Psychology. 85 (2): 235–238. doi:10.1037/0021-843X.85.2.235. PMID 1254784.
- Davidson, Richard J.; Goleman, Daniel J. (1977). "The role of attention in meditation and hypnosis: A psychobiological perspective on transformations of consciousness". International Journal of Clinical and Experimental Hypnosis. 25 (4): 291–308. doi:10.1080/00207147708415986. PMID 330418.

== See also ==
- Emotional aperture
