= Emotional Intelligence =

1995 book by Daniel Goleman

- First edition
- Author: Daniel Goleman
- Language: English
- Subject: Emotional intelligence
- Published: 1995
- Publisher: Bantam Books
- Publication place: United States
- Media type: Print
- Pages: 352
- ISBN: 978-0553383713

Emotional Intelligence: Why It Can Matter More Than IQ is a 1995 book by Daniel Goleman. In this book, Goleman posits that emotional intelligence is as important as IQ for success, including in academic, professional, social, and interpersonal aspects of one's life. Goleman says that emotional intelligence is a skill that can be taught and cultivated, and outlines methods for incorporating emotional skills training in school curriculum.

Emotional Intelligence was on The New York Times Best Seller list for a year and a half, a best-seller in many countries, and is in print worldwide in 40 languages.
