= Group emotion =

Disposition of a group

Group emotion refers to the moods, emotions and dispositional affects of a group of people. It can be seen as either an emotional entity influencing individual members' emotional states (top down) or the sum of the individuals' emotional states (bottom up).

== Top down approach ==
This view sees the group's dynamic processes as responsible for an elusive feeling state which influences the members' feelings and behavior. This view, that groups have an existence as entities beyond the characters that comprise them, has several angles.

=== Effects on individuals ===
One angle of this approach was depicted in early works such as Le Bon's and Freud's who reasoned that there is a general influence of a crowd or group which makes the members of the group "feel, think and act" differently than they would have as isolated individuals. The reassurance of belonging to a crowd makes people act more extremely. Also, the intense uniformity of feelings is overwhelming and causes people to be emotionally swept to join the group's atmosphere. Thus, the effect of the group causes emotions to be exaggerated.

=== Norms ===
Another aspect of the group as a whole perspective sees the normative forces a group has on its members' emotional behavior such as norms for the amount of feelings' expression and even which emotions it is best to feel. The group's norms control which emotions would (or at least should) be displayed at a specific situation according to the group's best interest and goals. The norms help differentiate felt emotions, what the individuals actually feel, from expressed emotions, what they display in the current situation. This perspective has practical implications as shown by researchers. Thus, according to this angle the group causes the emotions to be moderated and controlled.

=== Binding force ===
Another perspective emphasizes the importance of emotional attraction in group settings. It defines group emotion as members' desire to be together, and finds that emotional ties are a type of glue which holds groups together and influences the group's cohesiveness and the commitment to the task. This perspective focuses on the positive emotions of liking the other group members and the task at hand.

=== Indicator ===
This perspective of the group as a whole approach studies the dynamic development of the group, from its establishment to its disassembly. Along the course the group changes in its interrelationships and interdependence amongst its members. These changes are accompanied by emotional processes which shape the outcome of the group. For instance, the midpoint in a group's development is characterized by anxiety and anticipation about the capacity of the team to complete its goals, which drives teams to restructure their interaction patterns following the midpoint. Should the group harness these feelings and overcome the crisis stronger, its chances of completing the group's goals are higher. In other cases, negative emotions towards members of the group or towards the task might jeopardize the group's existence. This perspective sees the temporal changes of the emotions that govern the group.

== Bottom up ==
Contrary to the former approach, this approach views group-level emotion as the sum of its individuals' affective compositions. These affective compositions are actually the emotional features each member brings with him to the group, such as: dispositional affect, mood, acute emotions, emotional intelligence, and sentiments (affective evaluations of the group). The team affective composition approach helps to understand the group emotion and its origins, and how these individual members' affective predisposition combine to become one common entity. For the purpose of combining these individual characteristics, one can embrace several viewpoints:

=== Average mood ===
Research has shown that by averaging the members' dispositional affective tone it is possible to predict group-level behavior such as absenteeism and prosocial behavior. Also, when the average mood of employees was positive, it was positively related to the team's performance.

=== Emotional variance ===
Affective-homogenous groups are expected to behave differently from heterogeneous ones. The verdict is yet to be decided as to whether homogeneity is better than heterogeneity. In favor of affective homogeneity stand the notion that familiarity and similarity bring feelings of liking, comfort and positive emotions, and thus presumably better group outcomes and performances. It has long been found that people prefer to be in a group similar to them in many perspectives. A support for the positive effects of homogeneity can be found in a study that examined homogeneity in managers' positive affectivity (PA) and its influence on several aspects of performance such as satisfaction, cooperation and financial outcome of the organization. On the other hand, according to the view of opposites being beneficial, affective heterogeneity may lead to more emotional checks and balances which could then lead to better team performance. This was found to be true especially in groups where creativity is needed to complete the task appropriately. Homogeneity might lead to groupthink and hamper performance. It is necessary though for group members in heterogeneous groups to accept and allow one another to enact their different emotional roles.

=== Emotionally extreme members ===
Even if there is only one member in an otherwise averaged group which is extremely negative (or positive) in effect, that person might influence the affective state of the other members and cause the group to be much more negative (or positive) than would be expected from its mean-level dispositional affect. This mood shift might happen through emotional contagion, in which members are "infected" by others' emotions, as well as through other processes. Emotional contagion has been observed even in absence of non-verbal cues, for example on online social networks like Facebook and Twitter.

== Combining approaches ==
The above approaches can be combined in a way that they maintain reciprocal relations. For instance, members bring dispositional affective states and norms for expressing them to the team. These components are then factors determining the creation of group norms, which may in turn alter the moods, feelings and their expression by the members. Thus, the top-down and bottom-up approaches coalesce along the dynamic formation and lifespan of teams.

== Empirical definition ==
One study compared the reports of team members to reports of outside-observers. It showed that team affect and emotions were observable by and agreed upon by outsiders as well as by members of the team interacting face to face. So, it is possible to identify the group's affective tone by aggregating self-reports of members of the group, as well as by viewing the group from the outside and looking for emotional gestures, both verbal and nonverbal.

== Affecting group emotion ==
Studies show that the leader of the team has an important part in determining the moods of his team's members. Such that members of a team with a leader in a negative affective state tend to be more negative themselves than members of teams with a leader in a positive mood. However, any member of the group might influence the other members' emotions. He may do so either by way of implicit, automatic, emotional contagion or by explicit, deliberate, emotional influence in order to promote his interests. Other factors that affect the forming of the group's emotional state are its emotional history, its norms for expressing feelings and the broader organizational norms regarding emotions.

== Influence on performance ==
The emotional state of the group influences team processes and outcomes. For example, a group in a positive mood displays more coordination between members, yet sometimes the effort they apply is not as high as groups in a negative mood. Another role emotions play in group dynamics and performance is the relation between intra-group task-conflicts and relationship-conflicts. It is assumed that conflicts related to the task can be beneficial for achieving the goal, unless these task-conflicts lead to relationship-conflicts among the team members, in which case the performance is hindered. The traits that decouple task from relationship conflicts are emotional attributes such as emotional intelligence, intragroup relational ties, and norms for reducing or preventing negative emotionality. Hence aspects of group emotion affect the outcome. Other findings are that an increase in positive mood will lead to greater cooperativeness and less group conflict. Also, positive mood results in elevated perceptions of task performance.

== Evolutionary-psychological perspective ==
According to the evolutionary psychology approach, group affect has a function of helping communication between members of the group. The emotional state of the group informs its members about factors in the environment. For instance, if everyone is in a bad mood it is necessary to change the conditions, or perhaps work harder to achieve the goal and improve the conditions. Also, shared affect in groups coordinates group activity through fostering group bonds and group loyalty.

== Emotional aperture ==
Emotional aperture has been defined as the ability or skill to perceive features of group emotions. Examples of features of group emotions include the level of variability of emotions among members (i.e., affective diversity), the proportion of positive or negative emotions, and the modal (i.e., most common) emotion present in a group. The term "emotional aperture" was first defined by the social psychologist, Jeffrey Sanchez-Burks and organizational theorist, Quy Huy. Analogous to adjusting a camera's aperture setting to increase depth of field, emotional aperture involves adjusting one's depth of field to bring into focus not solely the emotions of one person but also others scattered across a visual landscape. The difference between perceiving individual-level emotions versus group-level emotions is builds upon the distinction between analytic versus holistic perception.

== See also ==
- Decision making
- Emotional aperture
- Group narcissism
- Industrial and organizational psychology
- Emotion in negotiation
- Social emotions
