= Are Holen =

Psychiatrist, associate dean medical faculty, ACEM-founder

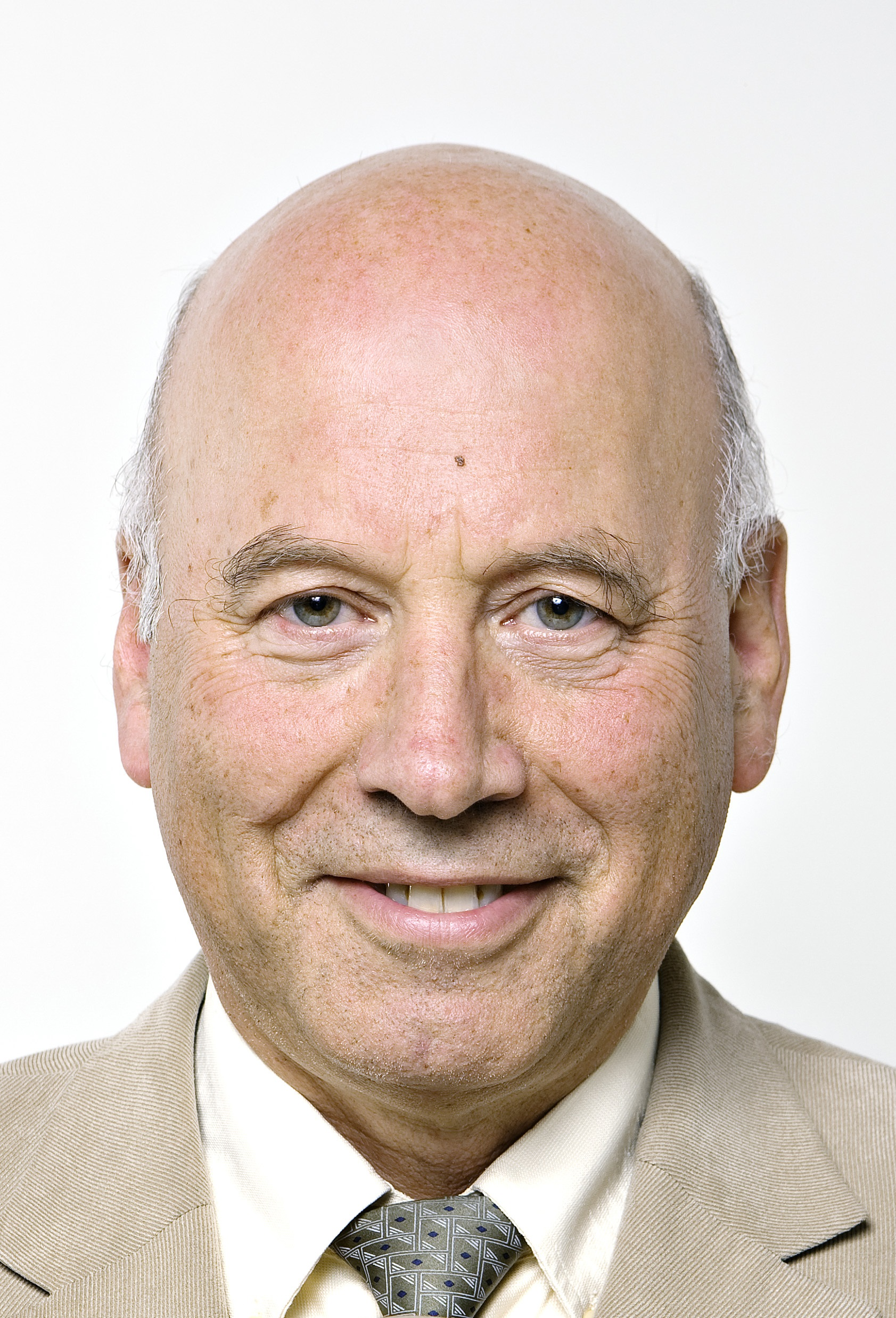
- Born: July 18, 1945 (age 81)
- Education: Norwegian University of Science and Technology
- Occupations: Psychiatrist, psychologist
- Employer: Norwegian University of Science and Technology
- Known for: Research on stress psychiatry and meditation

Are Holen (born 18 July 1945) is a Norwegian psychiatrist and psychologist, and professor of psychiatry at the Faculty of Medicine at the Norwegian University of Science and Technology. He specializes on stress psychiatry, and has done scientific research on meditation.

Holen earned the cand.psychol. degree in psychology in 1972 and the cand.med. (MD) degree in 1978, and a dr.med. (PhD) in 1990. He is also a trained psychotherapist.

In 1966 he founded the non-profit organisation Acem International School of Meditation.

== Writings ==
- "The North Sea Oil Rig Disaster." In International Handbook of Traumatic Stress Syndromes. Edited by John P. Wilson and Beverley Raphael. New York: Plenum, 1993. 471–478.
- With Christian Moldjord and Lars Kristian Fossum. "Coping with Peacekeeping Stress." In The Psychology of the Peacekeeper: Lessons From the Field. Edited by Thomas W. Britt and Amy B. Adler. Westport, Conn.: Praeger, 2003. 169–184.
