= Meditation =

Techniques to train attention and awareness

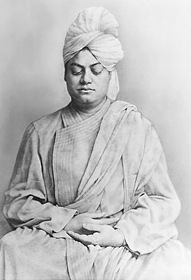
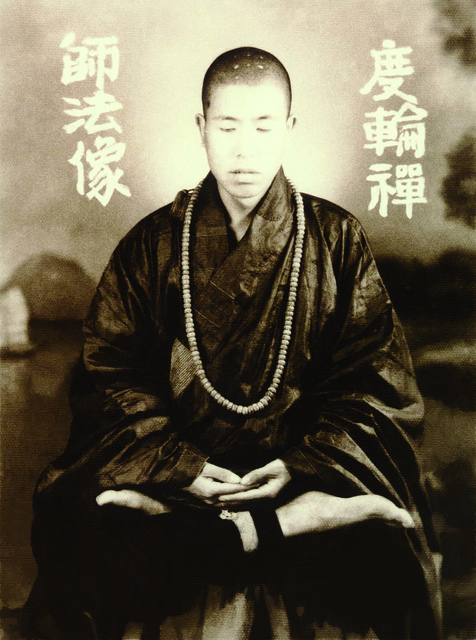
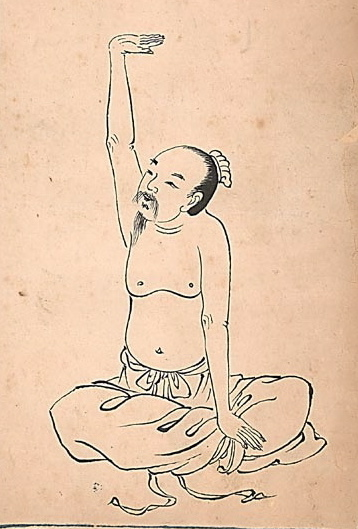
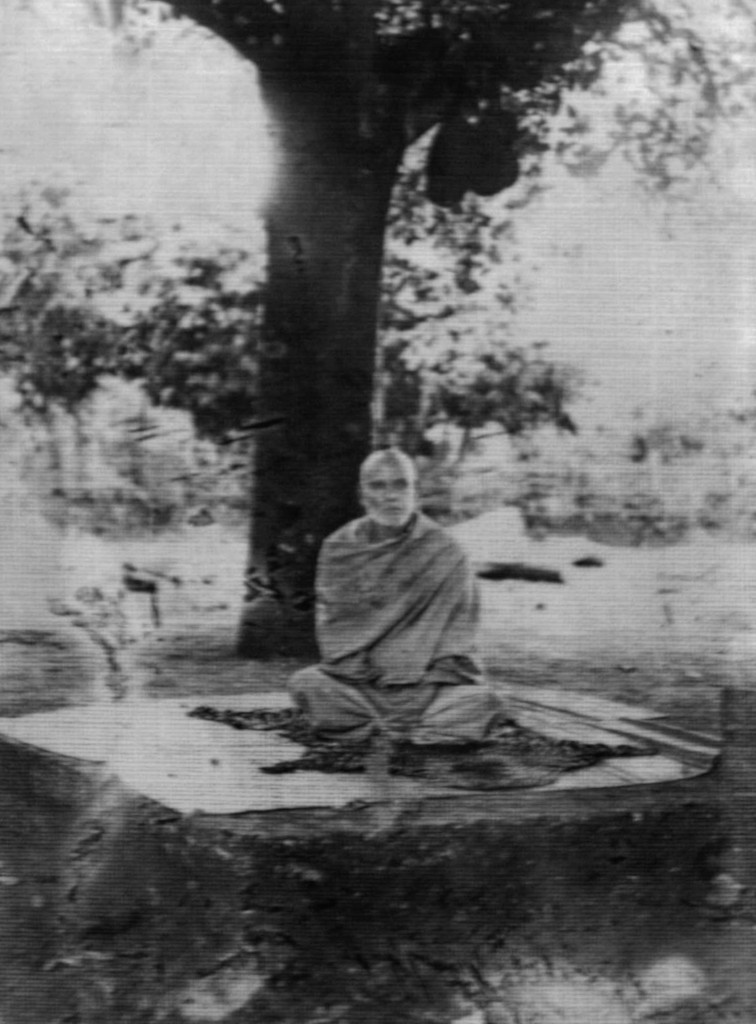
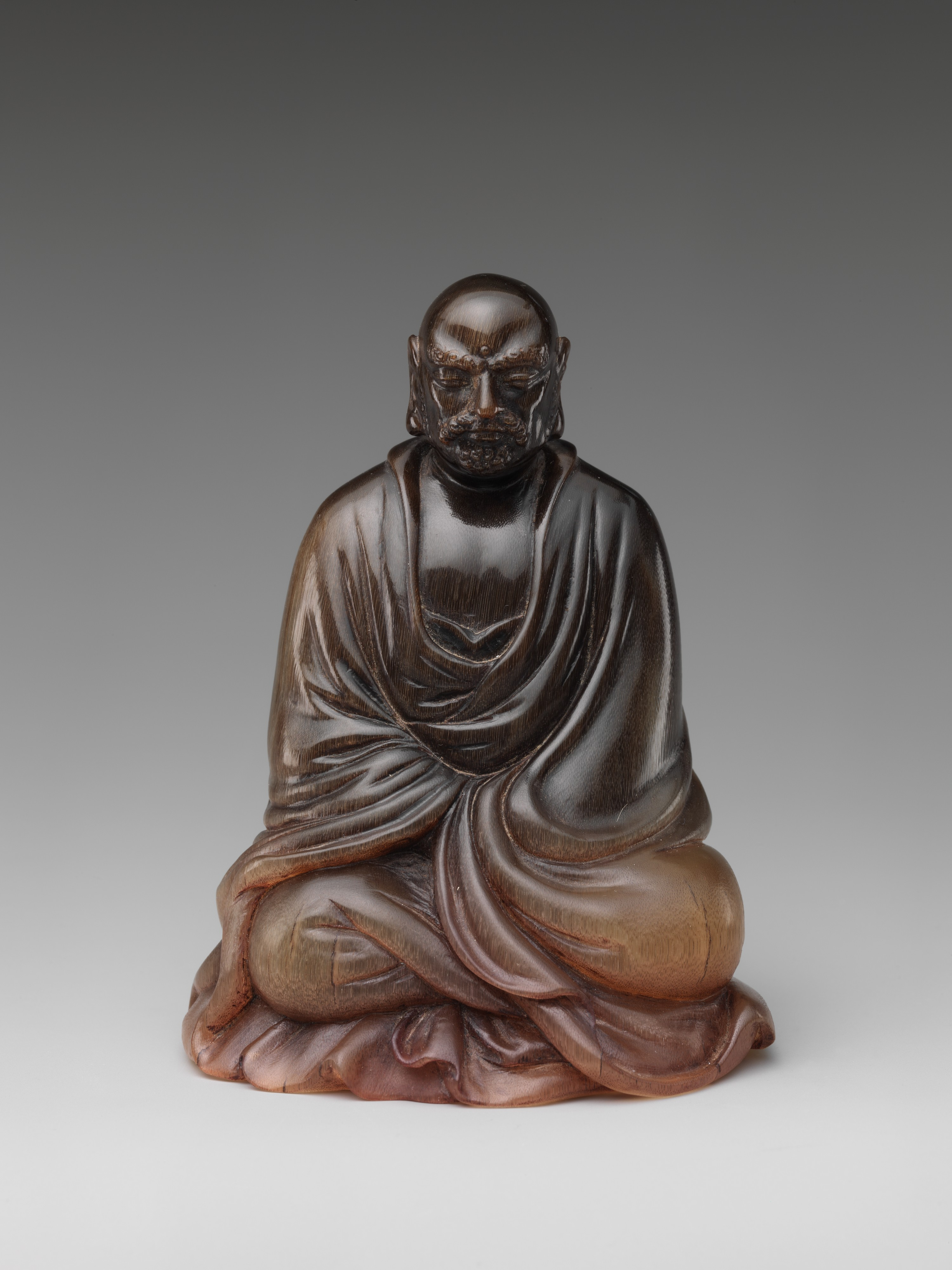
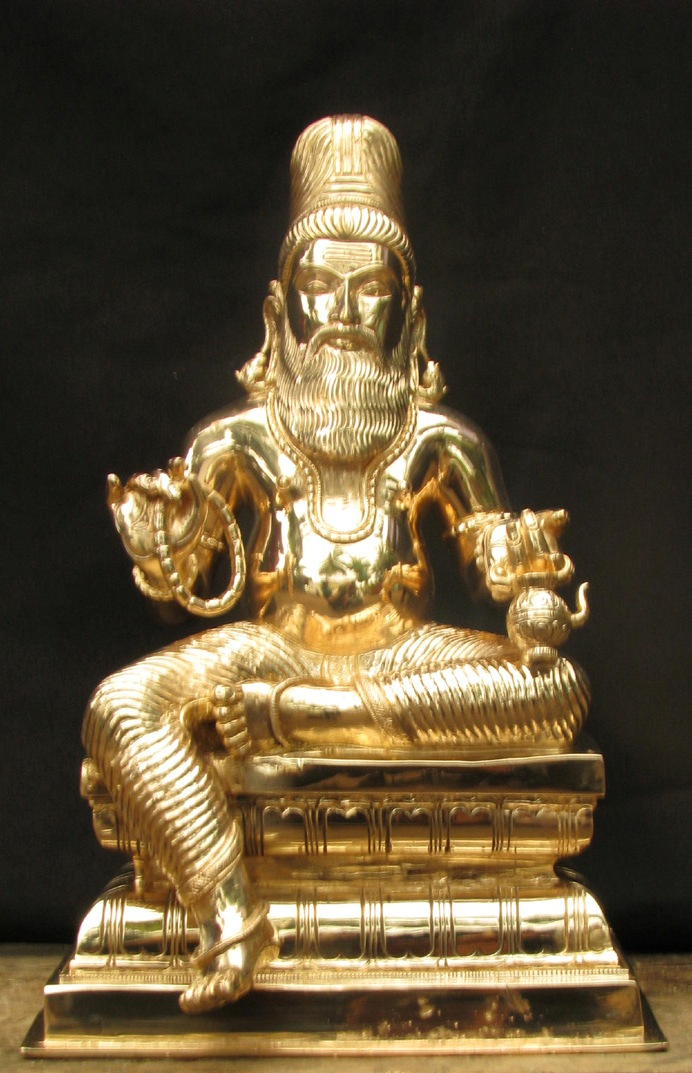
Various depictions of meditation (clockwise starting at the top left): the Hindu Swami Vivekananda, the Buddhist monk Hsuan Hua, Baduanjin qigong, Siddhar Agastyar, Chan monk Bodhidharma, and social reformer Narayana Guru.

Meditation is a practice in which an individual uses a technique or combination of techniques to train attention and awareness and detach from "discursive, ruminating thought", (Note: An influential definition by Shapiro (1982) states that "meditation refers to a family of techniques which have in common a conscious attempt to focus attention in a nonanalytical way and an attempt not to dwell on discursive, ruminating thought" (p. 6, italics in original). The term "discursive thought" has long been used in Western philosophy, and is often viewed as a synonym to logical thought.) achieving a mentally clear and emotionally calm and stable state, while not intending to analyze the effects, to judge its outcomes, or to create any expectation with regard to the process. (Note: Bond et al. (2009) report that 7 expert scholars who had studied different traditions of meditation agreed that an "essential" component of meditation "Involves logic relaxation: not 'to intend' to analyze the possible psychophysical effects, not 'to intend' to judge the possible results, not 'to intend' to create any type of expectation regarding the process" (p. 134, Table 4). In their final consideration, all 7 experts regarded this feature as an "essential" component of meditation; none of them regarded it as merely "important but not essential" (p. 234, Table 4). (This same result is presented in Table B1 in Ospina et al. 2007, p. 281). This does not mean that all meditation seeks to take a person beyond all thought processes, only those processes that are sometimes referred to as "discursive" or "logical" (see Shapiro 1982/1984; Bond et al. 2009; Appendix B, pp. 279–82 in Ospina et al. (2007)).)

Meditation techniques are broadly classified into focused (or concentrative) and open monitoring methods. Focused methods involve attention to specific objects like breath or mantras, while open monitoring includes mindfulness and awareness of subjective experiences in the present moment, and can also involve the active cultivation of wisdom.

Meditation is practiced in various religious traditions, and it is also practiced independently from any religious or spiritual influences for its health benefits. The earliest records of meditation (dhyana) are found in the Upanishads, and meditation plays a salient role in the contemplative repertoire of Jainism, Buddhism, Hinduism, and Taoism. Meditation-like techniques are also known in Judaism, Christianity, and Islam in the context of remembrance of and prayer and devotion to God.

Asian meditative techniques have spread to other cultures where they have found application in non-spiritual contexts, such as business and health. Several meta-analyses of clinical studies of mindfulness have demonstrated its mental and physical health benefits. Initially criticized for methodological weaknesses, meditation research now commonly employs randomized controlled trials, active control groups, and stronger methodological standards. Research is ongoing to better understand the effects of meditation on psychological, neurological, and cardiovascular health among other areas.

== Etymology ==
The English term meditation is derived from Old French meditacioun, in turn from Latin meditatio from a verb meditari, meaning "to think, contemplate, devise, ponder". In the Catholic tradition, the use of the term meditatio as part of a formal, stepwise process of meditation dates back to at least the 12th-century monk Guigo II, before which the Greek word theoria was used for the same purpose.

Apart from its historical usage, the term meditation was introduced as a translation for Eastern spiritual practices, referred to as dhyāna in Hinduism, Buddhism, and Jainism, which comes from the Sanskrit root dhyai, meaning to contemplate or meditate. The Greek word theoria actually derives from the same root.

The term "meditation" in English may also refer to practices from Islamic Sufism, or other traditions such as Jewish Kabbalah and Christian Hesychasm.

== Definitions ==
=== Difficulties in defining meditation ===
==== No universally accepted definition for meditation ====
Meditation has proven difficult to define as it covers a wide range of dissimilar practices in different traditions and cultures. (Note: In 1971, Claudio Naranjo noted that "The word 'meditation' has been used to designate a variety of practices that differ enough from one another so that we may find trouble defining what meditation is." A 2009 study noted a "persistent lack of consensus in the literature" and a "seeming intractability of defining meditation".) In popular usage, the word "meditation" and the phrase "meditative practice" are often used imprecisely to designate practices found across many cultures. These can include almost anything that is claimed to train the attention of mind or to teach calmness or compassion. There remains no definition of necessary and sufficient criteria for meditation that has achieved widespread acceptance within the modern scientific community.

==== Separation of technique from tradition ====
Some of the difficulty in precisely defining meditation has been in recognizing the particularities of the many various traditions; and theories and practices can differ within a tradition. Taylor noted that even within a faith such as "Hindu" or "Buddhist", schools and individual teachers may teach distinct types of meditation. Ornstein noted that "Most techniques of meditation do not exist as solitary practices but are only artificially separable from an entire system of practice and belief." For instance, while monks meditate as part of their everyday lives, they also engage in codified rules with specific outcomes, living together in monasteries with specific cultural settings that include local rites and rituals as part of a unified set of practices.

=== Dictionary definitions ===
Dictionaries give both the original Latin meaning of "think[ing] deeply about (something)", as well as the popular usages of "focusing one's mind for a period of time", "the act of giving your attention to only one thing, either as a religious activity or as a way of becoming calm and relaxed", and "to engage in mental exercise (such as concentrating on one's breathing or repetition of a mantra) for the purpose of reaching a heightened level of spiritual awareness."

=== Scholarly definitions ===
In modern psychological research, meditation has been defined and characterized in various ways. Many of these emphasize the role of attention and characterize the practice of meditation as attempts to detach from "discursive, ruminating thought", not judging the meditation-process itself ("logical relaxation"), to achieve a deeper, more devout, or more relaxed state.

Bond et al. (2009) identified criteria for defining a practice as meditation "for use in a comprehensive systematic review of the therapeutic use of meditation", using "a 5-round Delphi study with a panel of 7 experts in meditation research" who were also trained in diverse but empirically highly studied (Eastern-derived or clinical) forms of meditation (Note: "members were chosen on the basis of their publication record of research on the therapeutic use of meditation, their knowledge of and training in traditional or clinically developed meditation techniques, and their affiliation with universities and research centers. Each member had specific expertise and training in at least one of the following meditation practices: kundalini yoga, Transcendental Meditation, relaxation response, mindfulness-based stress reduction, and vipassana meditation" (Bond et al. 2009, p. 131); their views were combined using "the Delphi technique ... a method of eliciting and refining group judgments to address complex problems with a high level of uncertainty" (Bond et al. 2009, p. 131).):

three main criteria ... as essential to any meditation practice: the use of a defined technique, logic relaxation, and a self-induced state/mode.

Other criteria deemed important [but not essential] involve a state of psychophysical relaxation, the use of a self-focus skill or anchor, the presence of a state of suspension of logical thought processes, a religious/spiritual/philosophical context, or a state of mental silence.

... It is plausible that meditation is best thought of as a natural category of techniques best captured by 'family resemblances' ... or by the related 'prototype' model of concepts."

Several other definitions of meditation have been used by influential modern reviews of research on meditation across multiple traditions: (Note: Regarding influential reviews encompassing multiple methods of meditation: Walsh & Shapiro (2006), Cahn & Polich (2006), and Jevning, Wallace & Beidebach (1992), are cited >80 times in PsycINFO. Number of citations in PsycINFO: 254 for Walsh & Shapiro, 2006 (26 August 2018); 561 for Cahn & Polich, 2006 (26 August 2018); 83 for Jevning et al. (1992) (26 August 2018). Goleman's book has 33 editions listed in WorldCat: 17 editions as The meditative mind: The varieties of meditative experience and 16 editions as The varieties of meditative experience. Citation and edition counts are as of August 2018 and September 2018 respectively.)

- Walsh & Shapiro (2006): "Meditation refers to a family of self-regulation practices that focus on training attention and awareness in order to bring mental processes under greater voluntary control and thereby foster general mental well-being and development and/or specific capacities such as calm, clarity, and concentration"
- Cahn & Polich (2006): "Meditation is used to describe practices that self-regulate the body and mind, thereby affecting mental events by engaging a specific attentional set.... regulation of attention is the central commonality across the many divergent methods"
- Jevning et al. (1992): "We define meditation... as a stylized mental technique... repetitively practiced for the purpose of attaining a subjective experience that is frequently described as very restful, silent, and of heightened alertness, often characterized as blissful"
- Goleman (1988): "the need for the meditator to retrain his attention, whether through concentration or mindfulness, is the single invariant ingredient in... every meditation system"

=== Classifications ===
==== Focused and open methods ====
In the West, meditation techniques have often been classified in two broad categories, which in actual practice are often combined: focused (or concentrative) meditation and open monitoring (or mindfulness) meditation:

Direction of mental attention... A practitioner can focus intensively on one particular object (so-called concentrative meditation), on all mental events that enter the field of awareness (so-called mindfulness meditation), or both specific focal points and the field of awareness.

Focused methods include paying attention to the breath, to an idea or feeling (such as mettā – loving-kindness), to a kōan, or to a mantra (such as in transcendental meditation), and single point meditation. Open monitoring methods include mindfulness, shikantaza and other awareness states.

==== Other possible typologies ====
Another typology divides meditation approaches into concentrative, generative, receptive and reflective practices:

- concentrative: focused attention, including breath meditation, TM, and visualizations;
- generative: developing qualities like loving kindness and compassion;
- receptive: open monitoring;
- reflective: systematic investigation, contemplation.

The Buddhist tradition often divides meditative practice into samatha, or calm abiding, and vipassana, insight. Mindfulness of breathing, a form of focused attention, calms down the mind; this calmed mind can then investigate the nature of reality, by monitoring the fleeting and ever-changing constituents of experience, by reflective investigation, or by turning back the radiance, focusing awareness on awareness itself and discerning the true nature of mind as awareness itself. A similar distinction can be found in the Inchagiri Sampradaya, where mantra-recitation is used to quiet the mind, followed by self-inquiry, investigating what the source is of the "I" that is aware. (Note: With the Bird's Way, first one's mind must be made subtle. This is generally done with some initial meditation on a mantra or phrase which helps the aspirant to step beyond the mental/conceptual body, using a concept to go beyond conceptualization. (Note: sadguru.us, The Bird's way Archived 2015-03-30 at the Wayback Machine))

Matko and Sedlmeier (2019) "call into question the common division into 'focused attention' and 'open-monitoring' practices." They argue for "two orthogonal dimensions along which meditation techniques could be classified," namely "activation" and "amount of body orientation," proposing seven clusters of techniques: "mindful observation, body-centered meditation, visual concentration, contemplation, affect-centered meditation, mantra meditation, and meditation with movement."

Jonathan Shear argues that transcendental meditation is an "automatic self-transcending" technique, different from focused attention and open monitoring. In this kind of practice, "there is no attempt to sustain any particular condition at all. Practices of this kind, once started, are reported to automatically 'transcend' their own activity and disappear, to be started up again later if appropriate." (Note: According to Shear, "Focused Attention, Open Monitoring and Automatic Self-Transcending were likely to be associated with (γ and β)13, θ, and α1 EEG bands, respectively.") Yet, Shear also states that "automatic self-transcending" also applies to the way other techniques such as from Zen and Qigong are practiced by experienced meditators "once they had become effortless and automatic through years of practice."

== Technique ==
=== Posture ===
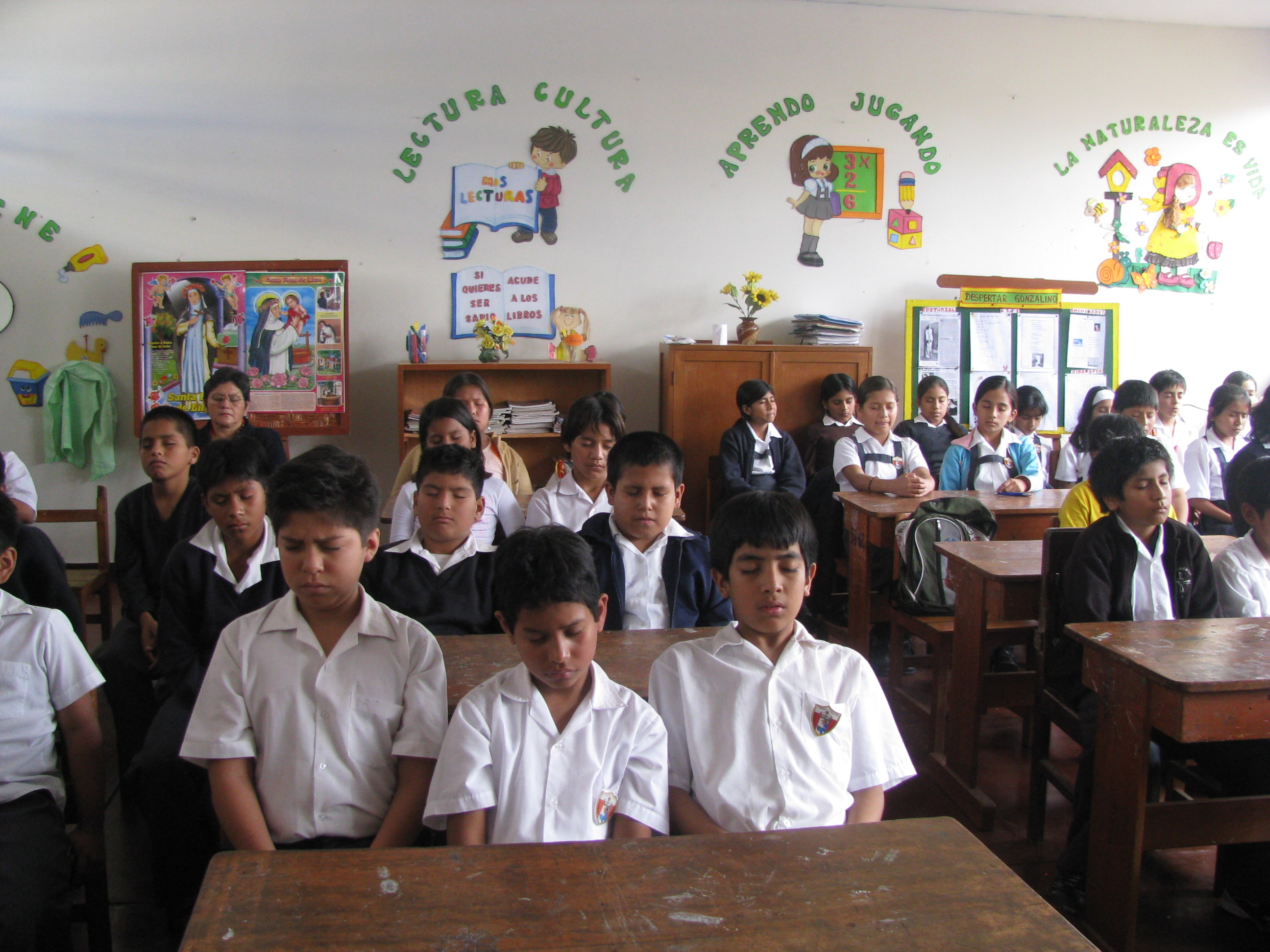
Young children practicing meditation in a Peruvian school

Asanas or body postures such as padmasana (full-lotus, half-lotus), cross-legged sitting, seiza, and kneeling positions are popular meditative postures in Hinduism, Buddhism, Taoism and Jainism, although other postures such as sitting, supine (lying), and standing are also used. Meditation is also sometimes done while walking, known as kinhin, while doing a simple task mindfully, known as samu, or while lying down, known as shavasana.

A 2018 pilot study scientifically compared the stability offered by three common meditation supports—a zafu cushion, a meditation bench, and a chair. The study found that the zafu provided the most stability against side-to-side body sway, while also concluding that chairs and benches are suitable alternatives for beginners, with chairs being specifically recommended for people with back pain or difficulty getting up from a low seated position.

=== Frequency ===
The Transcendental Meditation technique recommends practice of 20 minutes twice per day. Some techniques suggest less time, especially when starting meditation, and Richard Davidson has quoted research saying benefits can be achieved with a practice of only 8 minutes per day. Research shows improvement in meditation time with simple oral and video training. Some meditators practice for much longer, particularly when on a course or retreat. Some meditators find practice best in the hours before dawn.

=== Supporting aids ===
==== Use of prayer beads ====
Some religions have traditions of using prayer beads as tools in devotional meditation. Most prayer beads and Christian rosaries consist of pearls or beads linked together by a thread. The Roman Catholic rosary is a string of beads containing five sets with ten small beads. Eastern and Oriental Orthodox have traditions of using prayer ropes called Comboschini or Meqetaria as an aid to prayerful meditation. The Hindu japa mala has 108 beads. The figure 108 in itself having spiritual significance as the energy of the sounds equivalates to Om, as well as those used in Gaudiya Vaishnavism, the Hare Krishna tradition, and Jainism.

Buddhist prayer beads also have 108 beads, but hold a different meaning. In Buddhism, there are 108 human passions that impede enlightenment. Each bead is counted once as a person recites a mantra until the person has gone all the way around the mala. The Muslim misbaha has 99 beads. There is also quite a variance when it comes to materials used for beads. Beads made from seeds of rudraksha trees are considered sacred by devotees of Shiva, while followers of Vishnu revere the wood that comes from the Tulsi plant, also known as Holy Basil.

==== Striking the meditator ====
The Buddhist literature has many stories of Enlightenment being attained through disciples being struck by their masters. T. Griffith Foulk recounts how the encouragement stick was an integral part of the Zen practice when he trained:

In the Rinzai monastery where I trained in the mid-1970s, according to an unspoken etiquette, monks who were sitting earnestly and well were shown respect by being hit vigorously and often; those known as laggards were ignored by the hall monitor or given little taps if they requested to be hit. Nobody asked about the 'meaning' of the stick, nobody explained, and nobody ever complained about its use.

==== Using a narrative ====
Neuroscientist and long-time meditator Richard Davidson has expressed the view that having a narrative can help the maintenance of daily practice. For instance, he himself prostrates to the teachings, and meditates "not primarily for my benefit, but for the benefit of others".

==== Psychedelics ====
Studies suggest the potential of psychedelics, such as psilocybin and DMT, to enhance meditative training.

==== Walking Meditation ====
Walking meditation is a fundamental technique in Theravāda and Zen traditions. It involves walking slowly and mindfully in a straight path or circle, focusing attention on each step, the movement of the feet, the breath, and bodily sensations. It is often used in alternation with sitting meditation during retreats and daily practice to integrate mindfulness into bodily movement.

== Meditation traditions ==
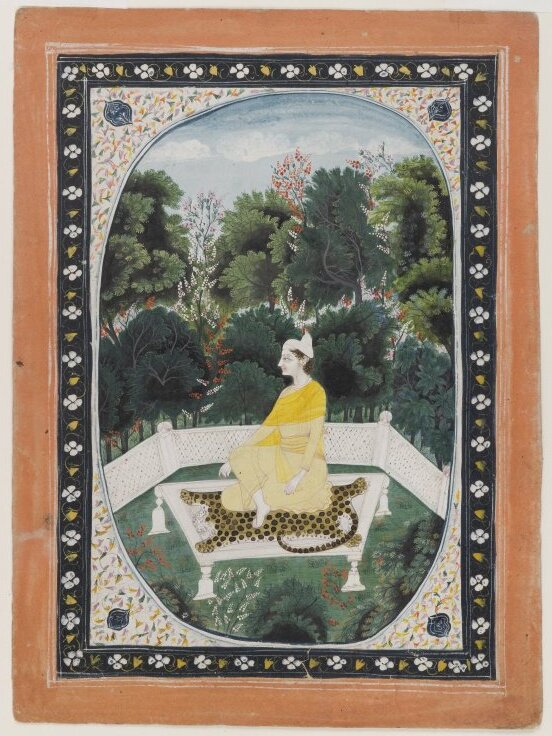
Man meditating in a garden setting (19th century)

=== Origins ===
The history of meditation is intimately bound up with the religious context within which it was practiced. Rossano suggested that the emergence of the capacity for focused attention, an element of many methods of meditation, may have contributed to the latest phases of human biological evolution. Some of the earliest references to meditation, as well as proto-Samkhya, are found in the Upanishads of India. According to Alexander Wynne, the earliest clear references to meditation are in the middle Upanishads and the Mahabharata (including the Bhagavad Gita). According to Gavin Flood, the earlier Brihadaranyaka Upanishad is describing meditation when it states that "Having become calm and concentrated, one perceives the self (Ātman) within oneself" (BU 4.4.23).

=== Indian religions ===
==== Hinduism ====
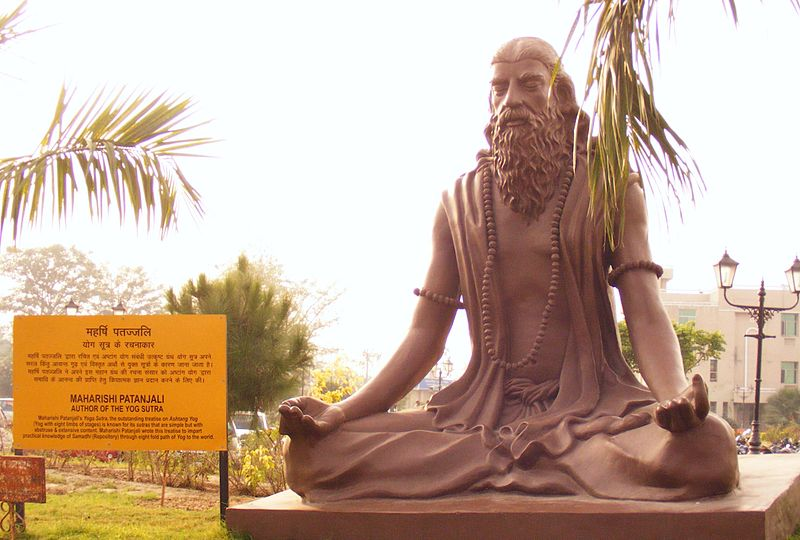
A statue of Patañjali practicing dhyana in the Padma-asana at Patanjali Yogpeeth

There are many schools and styles of meditation within Hinduism. In pre-modern and traditional Hinduism, Yoga and Dhyana are practised to recognize 'pure awareness', or 'pure consciousness', undisturbed by the workings of the mind, as one's eternal self. In Advaita Vedanta jivatman, individual self, is recognized as illusory, and in Reality identical with the omnipresent and non-dual Ātman-Brahman. In the dualistic Yoga school and Samkhya, the Self is called Purusha, a pure consciousness undisturbed by Prakriti, 'nature'. Depending on the tradition, the liberative event is named moksha, vimukti or kaivalya.

One of the most influential texts of classical Hindu Yoga is Patañjali's Yoga sutras (c. 400 CE), a text associated with Yoga and Samkhya and influenced by Buddhism, (Note: According to Larson 2008, pp. 43–45, from Abhidharma Buddhism's idea of nirodhasamadhi the Yoga Sutras adopt the pursuit of an altered state of awareness. However, unlike Buddhism, which avoids stating whether self and soul exist, Yoga is physicalist and realist, like Samkhya, believing that each individual has a self and soul. Karel Werner writes, "Patanjali's system is unthinkable without Buddhism. As far as its terminology goes there is much in the Yoga Sutras that reminds us of Buddhist formulations from the Pāli Canon and even more so from the Sarvāstivāda Abhidharma and from Sautrāntika." See also D. Wujastyk (2018), Some Problematic Yoga Sutras and their Buddhist Background, in: P. Maas et al., Yoga in Transformation. Historical and Contemporary Perspectives on a Global Phenomenon, Vienna University Press; and Pradeep P. Gokhale (2020), The Yogasūtra of Patañjali: A New Introduction to the Buddhist Roots of the Yoga System, Routledge.) which outlines eight limbs leading to kaivalya ("aloneness") or inner awareness. The first four, known as the "outer limbs," include ethical discipline (yamas), rules (niyamas), physical postures (āsanas), and breath control (prāṇāyama). The fifth, withdrawal from the senses (pratyāhāra), transitions into the "inner limbs" that are one-pointedness of mind (dhāraṇā), meditation (dhyāna), and finally samādhi.

Later developments in Hindu meditation include the compilation of Hatha Yoga (forceful yoga) compendiums like the Hatha Yoga Pradipika, the development of Bhakti yoga as a major form of meditation, and Tantra. Another important Hindu yoga text is the Yoga Yajnavalkya, which makes use of Hatha Yoga and Vedanta Philosophy.

===== Mantra Meditation =====
The Bhagavata Purana emphasizes that mantra meditation is a key practice for achieving liberation; practitioners can achieve a direct vision of the divine. The text integrates both Vedic and tantric elements, where mantras are not only seen as sacred sounds but as embodiment of the deity. This approach reflects a shift from the impersonal meditation on the sound-form of Brahman (Om) in the Upanishads to a personal, devotional focus on Krishna in the Bhagavata Purana.

==== Jainism ====
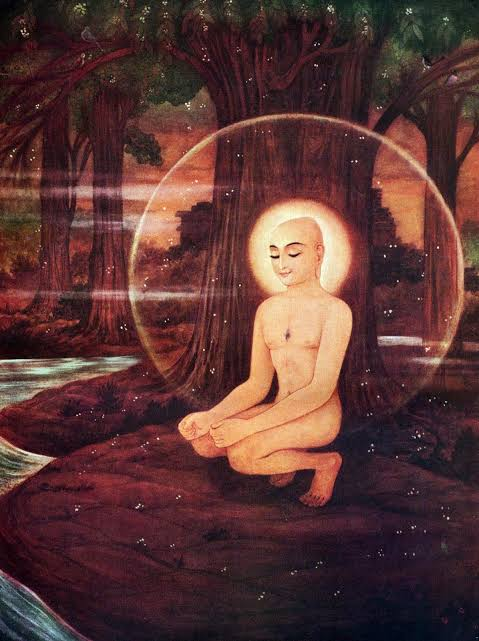
Lord Mahavir attaining omniscience in shukla dhyana, the highest level of meditation

Jainism has three elements called the Ratnatraya ("Three Jewels"): right perception and faith, right knowledge and right conduct. Meditation in Jainism aims to reach and to remain in the pure state of soul which is believed to be pure consciousness, beyond any attachment or aversion. The practitioner strives to be just a knower-seer (gyata-drashta) of body, thoughts, emotions; and strives to be grounded and steadfast in awareness of the pure nature of the soul. Jain meditation can be broadly categorized into Dharma dhyana and Shukla dhyana. Dharma dhyana is discriminating knowledge (bheda-vijñāna) of the tattvas (truths or fundamental principles), while shukla dhyana is meditation proper.

Jainism uses meditation techniques such as pindāstha-dhyāna, padāstha-dhyāna, rūpāstha-dhyāna, rūpātita-dhyāna, and savīrya-dhyāna. In padāstha dhyāna, one focuses on a mantra, a combination of core letters or words on deity or themes. Jain followers practice mantra regularly by chanting loudly or silently in mind.

The meditation technique of contemplation includes agnya vichāya, in which one contemplates on seven facts – life and non-life, the inflow, bondage, stoppage and removal of karmas, and the final accomplishment of liberation. In apaya vichāya, one contemplates on the incorrect insights one indulges, which eventually develops right insight. In vipaka vichāya, one reflects on the eight causes or basic types of karma. In sansathan vichāya, one thinks about the vastness of the universe and the loneliness of the soul.

==== Buddhism ====
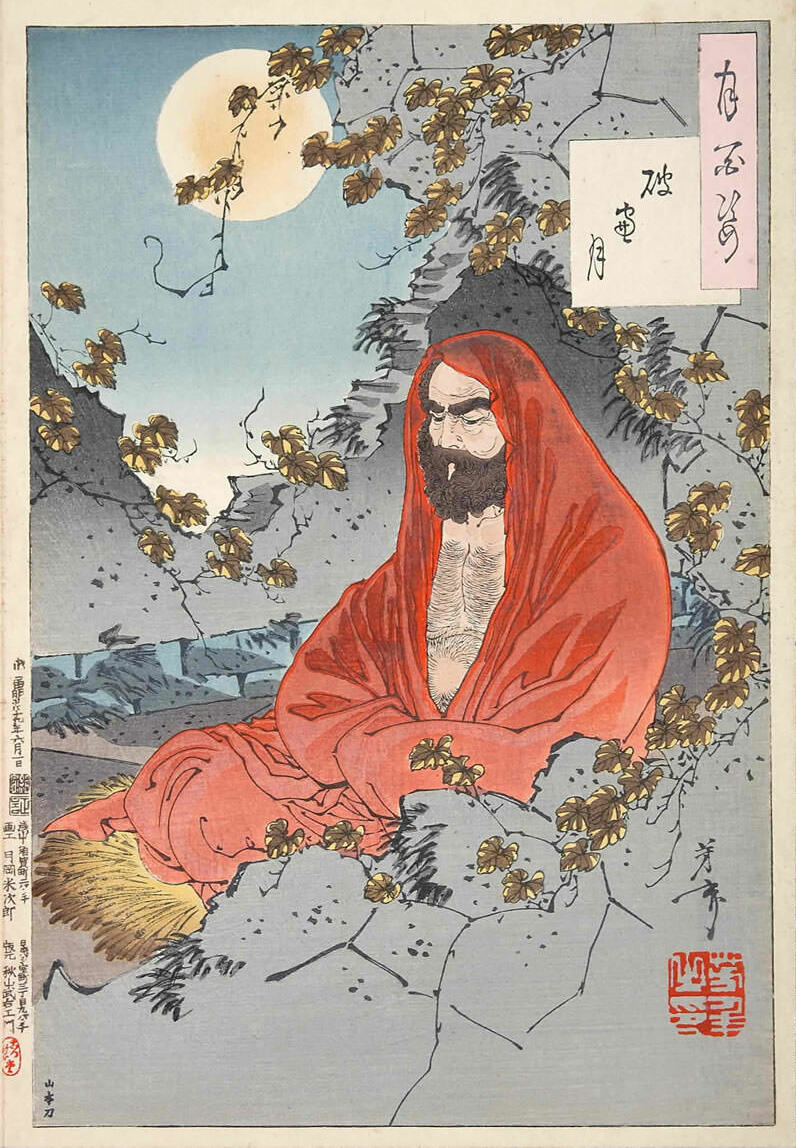
Bodhidharma practicing zazen

Buddhists pursue meditation as part of the path toward awakening and nirvana. (Note: For instance, Kamalashila (2003, p. 4), states that Buddhist meditation "includes any method of meditation that has Enlightenment as its ultimate aim." Likewise, Bodhi (1999) writes: "To arrive at the experiential realization of the truths it is necessary to take up the practice of meditation.... At the climax of such contemplation the mental eye ... shifts its focus to the unconditioned state, Nibbana...." A similar although in some ways slightly broader definition is provided by: "Meditation – general term for a multitude of religious practices, often quite different in method, but all having the same goal: to bring the consciousness of the practitioner to a state in which he can come to an experience of 'awakening,' 'liberation,' 'enlightenment.'" Kamalashila (2003) further allows that some Buddhist meditations are "of a more preparatory nature" (p. 4).) The closest words for meditation in the classical languages of Buddhism are bhāvanā ("development"), and the core practices of body contemplations (repulsiveness and cemetery contemplations) and anapanasati (mindfulness of in-and-out breathing) (Note: The Pāli and Sanskrit word bhāvanā literally means "development" as in "mental development." For the association of this term with "meditation," see Epstein (1995, p. 105); and Fischer-Schreiber, Ehrhard & Diener (1991, p. 20). As an example from a well-known discourse of the Pali Canon, in "The Greater Exhortation to Rahula" (Maha-Rahulovada Sutta, MN 62), Ven. Sariputta tells Ven. Rahula (in Pali, based on VRI, n.d.): ānāpānassatiṃ, rāhula, bhāvanaṃ bhāvehi. Ṭhānissaro Bhikkhu (2006). "Maha-Rahulovada Sutta: The Greater Exhortation to Rahula (MN 62)". Archived from the original on 1 February 2021. translates this as: "Rahula, develop the meditation [bhāvana] of mindfulness of in-&-out breathing." (Square-bracketed Pali word included based on Ṭhānissaro Bhikkhu, 2006, end note) culminating in jhāna/dhyāna or samādhi. (Note: See, for example, Ṭhānissaro Bhikkhu (1997). "One Tool Among Many: The Place of Vipassana in Buddhist Practice". Archived from the original on 12 April 2010.; as well as Kapleau (1989, p. 385) for the derivation of the word "zen" from Sanskrit "dhyāna". Pāli Text Society Secretary Rupert Gethin, in describing the activities of wandering ascetics contemporaneous with the Buddha, wrote: There is the cultivation of meditative and contemplative techniques aimed at producing what might, for the lack of a suitable technical term in English, be referred to as "altered states of consciousness". In the technical vocabulary of Indian religious texts such states come to be termed "meditations" ([Skt.:] dhyāna / [Pali:] jhāna) or "concentrations" (samādhi); the attainment of such states of consciousness was generally regarded as bringing the practitioner to deeper knowledge and experience of the nature of the world. (Gethin 1998, p. 10))

While most classical and contemporary Buddhist meditation guides are school-specific, (Note: Examples of contemporary school-specific classics include: from the Theravada tradition, Thera (1996).; from the Zen tradition, Kapleau (1989).) the root meditative practices of various body recollections and breath meditation have been preserved and transmitted in almost all Buddhist traditions, through Buddhist texts like the Satipatthana Sutta and the Dhyana sutras, and through oral teacher-student transmissions. These ancient practices are supplemented with various distinct interpretations of, and developments in, these practices.

The Theravāda tradition stresses the development of samatha and vipassana, postulating over fifty methods for developing mindfulness based on the Satipatthana Sutta, (Note: Goldstein (2003) writes that, in regard to the Satipatthana Sutta, "there are more than fifty different practices outlined in this Sutta. The meditations that derive from these foundations of mindfulness are called vipassana..., and in one form or another – and by whatever name – are found in all the major Buddhist traditions" (p. 92).) and forty for developing concentration based on the Visuddhimagga.

The Tibetan tradition incorporated Sarvastivada and Tantric practices, wedded with Madhyamaka philosophy, and developed thousands of visualization meditations. (Note: Regarding Tibetan visualizations, Kamalashila (2003), writes: "The Tara meditation ... is one example out of thousands of subjects for visualization meditation, each one arising out of some meditator's visionary experience of enlightened qualities, seen in the form of Buddhas and Bodhisattvas" (p. 227).)

The Zen tradition incorporated mindfulness and breath-meditation via the Dhyana sutras, which are based on the Sarvastivada-tradition. Sitting meditation, known as zazen, is a central part of Zen practice. Downplaying the "petty complexities" of satipatthana and the body-recollections (but maintaining the awareness of immanent death), the early Chan-tradition developed the notions or practices of wu nian ("no thought, no fixation on thought, such as one's own views, experiences, and knowledge"); fēi sīliàng (非思量, Japanese: hishiryō, "nonthinking"); kanxin ("observing the mind"); and shou-i pu i (守一不移, "maintaining the one without wavering"), turning the attention from the objects of experience, to the nature of mind, the perceiving subject itself, which is equated with Buddha-nature.

The Silk Road transmission of Buddhism introduced Buddhist meditation to other Asian countries, reaching China in the 2nd century CE, and Japan in the 6th century CE. In the modern era, Buddhist meditation techniques have become popular in the wider world, due to the influence of Buddhist modernism on Asian Buddhism, and western lay interest in Zen and the Vipassana movement, with many non-Buddhists taking-up meditative practices. The modernized concept of mindfulness (based on the Buddhist term sati) and related meditative practices have in turn led to mindfulness based therapies.

===== Dhyana =====
Dhyana, while often presented as a form of focused attention or concentration, as in Buddhagosa's Theravada classic the Visuddhimagga ("Path of purification", 5th c. CE), according to a number of contemporary scholars and scholar-practitioners, it is actually a description of the development of perfected equanimity and mindfulness, apparently induced by satipatthana, an open monitoring of the breath, without trying to regulate it. The same description, in a different formula, can be found in the bojjhanga, the "seven factors of awakening," and may therefore refer to the core program of early Buddhist bhavana. According to Vetter, dhyana seems to be a natural development from the sense-restraint and moral constrictions prescribed by the Buddhist tradition.

===== Samatha and vipassana =====
The Buddha identified two paramount mental qualities that arise from wholesome meditative practice or bhavana, namely samatha ("calm," "serenity" "tranquility") and vipassana (insight). As the developing tradition started to emphasize the value of liberating insight, and dhyana came to be understood as concentration, samatha and vipassana were understood as two distinct meditative techniques. In this understanding, samatha steadies, composes, unifies and concentrates the mind, while vipassana enables one to see, explore and discern "formations" (conditioned phenomena based on the five aggregates). (Note: These definitions of samatha and vipassana are based on the "Four Kinds of Persons Sutta" (AN 4.94). This article's text is primarily based on Bodhi (2005, pp. 269–70, 440 n. 13). See also Ṭhānissaro Bhikkhu (1998d). "Samadhi Sutta: Concentration (Tranquillity and Insight) (AN 4.94)". Archived from the original on 13 October 2018..)

According to this understanding, which is central to Theravada orthodoxy but also plays a role in Tibetan Buddhism, through the meditative development of serenity, one is able to weaken the obscuring hindrances and bring the mind to a collected, pliant, and still state (samadhi). This quality of mind then supports the development of insight and wisdom (Prajñā) which is the quality of mind that can "clearly see" (vi-passana) the nature of phenomena. What exactly is to be seen varies within the Buddhist traditions. In Theravada, all phenomena are to be seen as impermanent, suffering, not-self and empty. When this happens, one develops dispassion (viraga) for all phenomena, including all negative qualities and hindrances and lets them go. It is through the release of the hindrances and ending of craving through the meditative development of insight that one gains liberation.

==== Sikhism ====
In Sikhism, simran (meditation) and good deeds are both necessary to achieve the devotee's spiritual goals; without good deeds meditation is futile. When Sikhs meditate, they aim to feel God's presence and emerge in the divine light. It is only God's divine will or order that allows a devotee to desire to begin to meditate. Nām japnā involves focusing one's attention on the names or great attributes of God.

=== Taoism ===
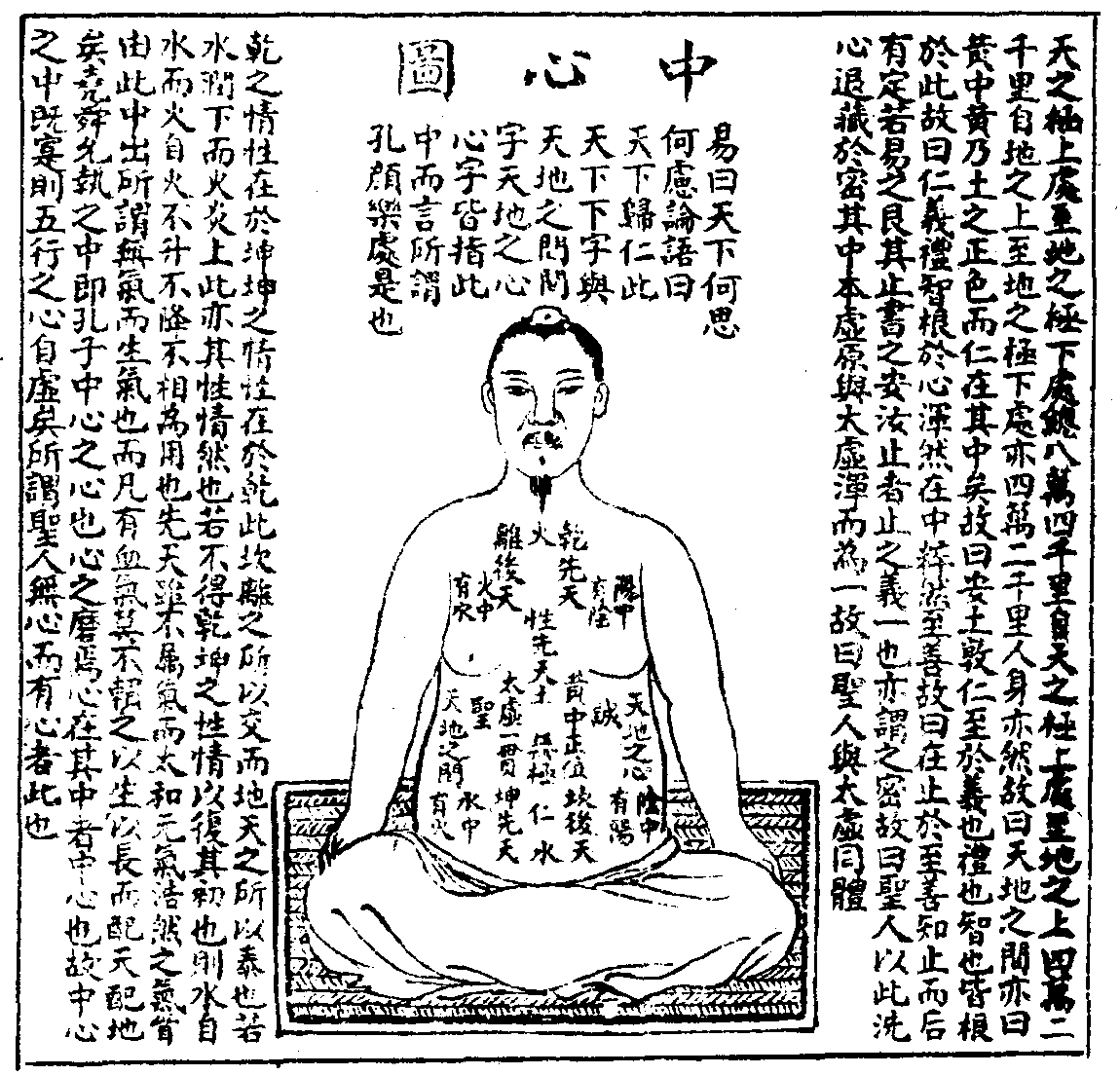
Centering the Mind 中心圖, 1615 Xingming guizhi

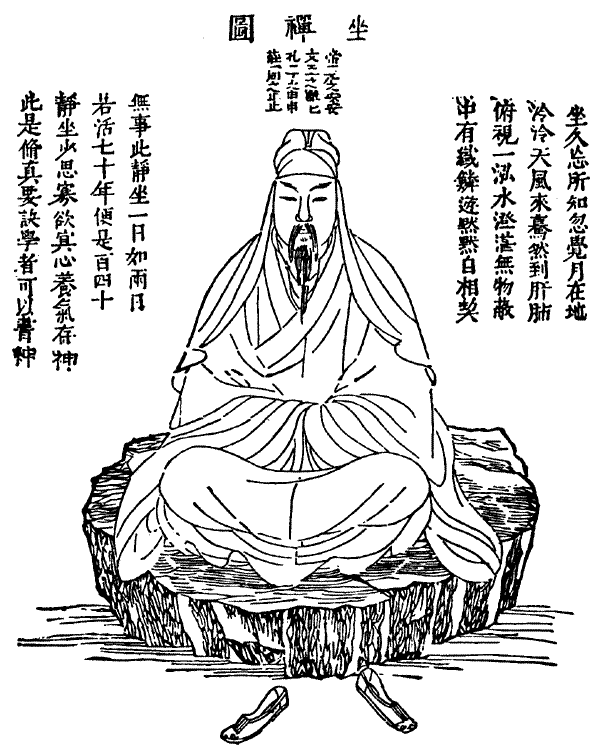
"Gathering the Light", Taoist meditation from The Secret of the Golden Flower

Taoist meditation has developed techniques including concentration, visualization, qi cultivation, contemplation, and mindfulness meditations in its long history. Traditional Daoist meditative practices influenced Buddhism creating the unique meditative practices of Chinese Buddhism that then spread through the rest of east Asia from around the 5th century. Traditional Chinese medicine and the Chinese martial arts were influenced and influences of Taoist meditation.

Livia Kohn distinguishes three basic types of Taoist meditation: "concentrative", "insight", and "visualization". Ding 定 (literally means "decide; settle; stabilize") refers to "deep concentration", "intent contemplation", or "perfect absorption". Guan 觀 (lit. 'watch; observe; view') meditation seeks to merge and attain unity with the Dao. It was developed by Tang dynasty (618–907) Taoist masters and teaching influenced the formation and acceptance of the Tiantai Buddhist practice within the Chinese society including the practices of Vipassanā "insight" or "wisdom" meditation and Cun 存 (lit. 'exist; be present; survive') that has a sense of "to cause to exist; to make present" in the meditation techniques popularized by the Taoist Shangqing and Lingbao Schools. A meditator visualizes or actualizes solar and lunar essences, lights, and deities within their body, which supposedly results in health and longevity, even xian 仙/仚/僊, "immortality".

The Guanzi essay (late 4th century BCE) Neiye "Inward training" is the oldest received writing on the subject of qi cultivation through breath-control meditation techniques. For instance, "When you enlarge your mind and let go of it, when you relax your vital breath and expand it, when your body is calm and unmoving: And you can maintain the One and discard the myriad disturbances. ... This is called "revolving the vital breath": Your thoughts and deeds seem heavenly."

The Taoist Zhuangzi (c. 3rd century BCE) records zuowang or "sitting forgetting" meditation. Confucius asked his disciple Yan Hui to explain what "sit and forget" means: "I slough off my limbs and trunk, dim my intelligence, depart from my form, leave knowledge behind, and become identical with the Transformational Thoroughfare."

Taoist meditation practices are central to the development of Chinese cultivation practices including Chinese medicine and Wushu (武術) training and Budō (武道) in Japan. Historically these techniques and teachings come through the qi-related traditions called neijia or translated as "internal arts" Some well-known examples are daoyin ("guiding and pulling"), qigong ("life-energy exercises"), neigong ("internal exercises"), neidan ("internal alchemy"), and tai chi ("great ultimate boxing"), which is thought of as moving meditation. One common explanation contrasts "movement in stillness" referring to energetic visualization of qi circulation in qigong and zuochan ("seated meditation"), versus "stillness in movement" referring to a state of meditative calm in tai chi forms. Also the unification or middle road forms such as Wuxingheqidao that seeks the unification of internal alchemical forms with more external forms.`

=== Abrahamic religions ===
==== Judaism ====
Judaism has made use of meditative practices for thousands of years. For instance, in the Torah, the patriarch Isaac is described as going "לשוח" (lasuach) in the field – a term understood by the commentator Malbim as some type of meditative practice (Genesis 24:63). Similarly, there are indications throughout the Tanakh (the Hebrew Bible) that the prophets meditated. In the Old Testament, there are two Hebrew words for meditation: hāgâ (Hebrew: הגה), to sigh or murmur, but also to meditate, and sîḥâ (Hebrew: שיחה), to muse, or rehearse in one's mind.

Classical Jewish texts espouse a wide range of meditative practices, often associated with the cultivation of kavanah or intention. The first layer of rabbinic law, the Mishnah, describes ancient sages "waiting" for an hour before their prayers, "in order to direct their hearts to the Omnipresent One" (Mishnah Berakhot 5:1). Other early rabbinic texts include instructions for visualizing the Divine Presence (B. Talmud Sanhedrin 22a) and breathing with conscious gratitude for every breath (Genesis Rabba 14:9).

One of the best-known types of meditation in early Jewish mysticism was the work of the Merkabah, from the root /R-K-B/ meaning "chariot" (of God). Some meditative traditions have been encouraged in Kabbalah, and some Jews have described Kabbalah as an inherently meditative field of study. Kabbalistic meditation often involves the mental visualization of the supernal realms. Aryeh Kaplan has argued that the ultimate purpose of Kabbalistic meditation is to understand and cleave to the Divine.

Meditation has been of interest to a wide variety of modern Jews. In modern Jewish practice, one of the best known meditative practices is called "hitbodedut" (התבודדות, alternatively transliterated as "hisbodedus"), and is explained in Kabbalistic, Hasidic, and Mussar writings, especially the Hasidic method of Rabbi Nachman of Breslav. The word derives from the Hebrew word "boded" (בודד), meaning the state of being alone. Another Hasidic system is the Habad method of "hisbonenus", related to the Sephirah of "Binah", Hebrew for understanding. This practice is the analytical reflective process of making oneself understand a mystical concept well, that follows and internalises its study in Hasidic writings. The Musar Movement, founded by Rabbi Israel Salanter in the middle of the nineteenth-century, emphasized meditative practices of introspection and visualization that could help to improve moral character. Conservative rabbi Alan Lew has emphasized meditation playing an important role in the process of teshuvah (repentance). Jewish Buddhists have adopted Buddhist styles of meditation.

==== Christianity ====
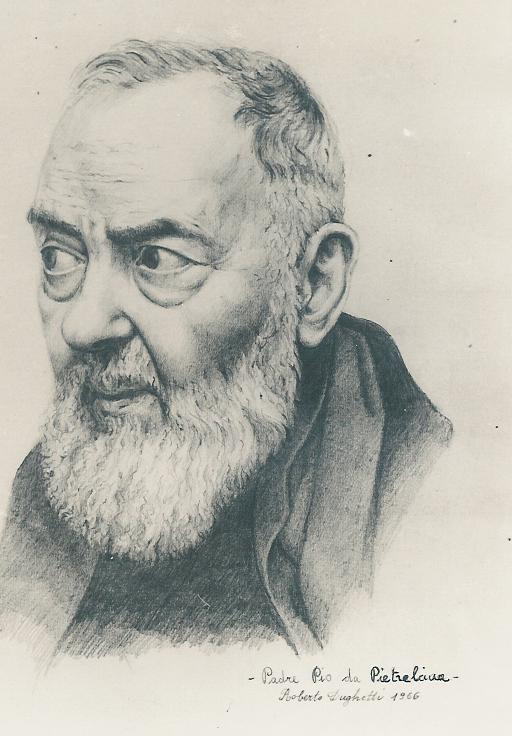
Saint Pio of Pietrelcina stated: "Through the study of books one seeks God; by meditation one finds Him."

Christian meditation is a term for a form of prayer in which a structured attempt is made to get in touch with and deliberately reflect upon the revelations of God. In the Roman Empire, by 20 BCE Philo of Alexandria had written on some form of "spiritual exercises" involving attention (prosoche) and concentration and by the 3rd century Plotinus had developed meditative techniques. The word meditation comes from the Latin word meditatum, which means to "concentrate" or "to ponder". Monk Guigo II introduced this terminology for the first time in the 12th century AD. Christian meditation is the process of deliberately focusing on specific thoughts (e.g. a biblical scene involving Jesus and the Virgin Mary) and reflecting on their meaning in the context of the love of God. Christian meditation is sometimes taken to mean the middle level in a broad three-stage characterization of prayer: it then involves more reflection than first level vocal prayer, but is more structured than the multiple layers of contemplation in Christianity.

Between the 10th and 14th centuries, hesychasm was developed, particularly on Mount Athos in Greece, and involves the repetition of the Jesus prayer. Interactions with Indians or the Sufis may have influenced the Eastern Christian meditation approach to hesychasm, but this is unproven.

Western Christian meditation contrasts with most other approaches in that it does not involve the repetition of any phrase or action and requires no specific posture. Western Christian meditation progressed from the 6th century practice of Bible reading among Benedictine monks called Lectio Divina, i.e. divine reading. Its four formal steps as a "ladder" were defined by the monk Guigo II in the 12th century with the Latin terms lectio, meditatio, oratio, and contemplatio (i.e. read, ponder, pray, contemplate). Western Christian meditation was further developed by saints such as Ignatius of Loyola and Teresa of Avila in the 16th century.

On 28 April 2021, Pope Francis, in an address to the General Audience, said that meditation is a need for everyone. He stated that the term "meditation" has had many meanings throughout history, and that "the ancients used to say that the organ of prayer is the heart."

In Catholic Christianity, the Rosary is a devotion for the meditation of the mysteries of Jesus and Mary. "The gentle repetition of its prayers makes it an excellent means to moving into deeper meditation. It gives us an opportunity to open ourselves to God's word, to refine our interior gaze by turning our minds to the life of Christ. The first principle is that meditation is learned through practice. Many people who practice rosary meditation begin very simply and gradually develop a more sophisticated meditation. The meditator learns to hear an interior voice, the voice of God. Similarly, the chotki of the Eastern Orthodox denomination, the Wreath of Christ of the Lutheran faith, and the Anglican prayer beads of the Episcopalian tradition are used for Christian prayer and meditation.

According to Edmund P. Clowney, Christian meditation contrasts with Eastern forms of meditation as radically as the portrayal of God the Father in the Bible contrasts with depictions of Krishna or Brahman in Indian teachings. Unlike some Eastern styles, most styles of Christian meditation do not rely on the repeated use of mantras, and yet are also intended to stimulate thought and deepen meaning. Christian meditation aims to heighten the personal relationship based on the love of God that marks Christian communion. In Aspects of Christian meditation, the Catholic Church warned of potential incompatibilities in mixing Christian and Eastern styles of meditation. In 2003, in A Christian reflection on the New Age the Vatican announced that the "Church avoids any concept that is close to those of the New Age".

==== Islam ====
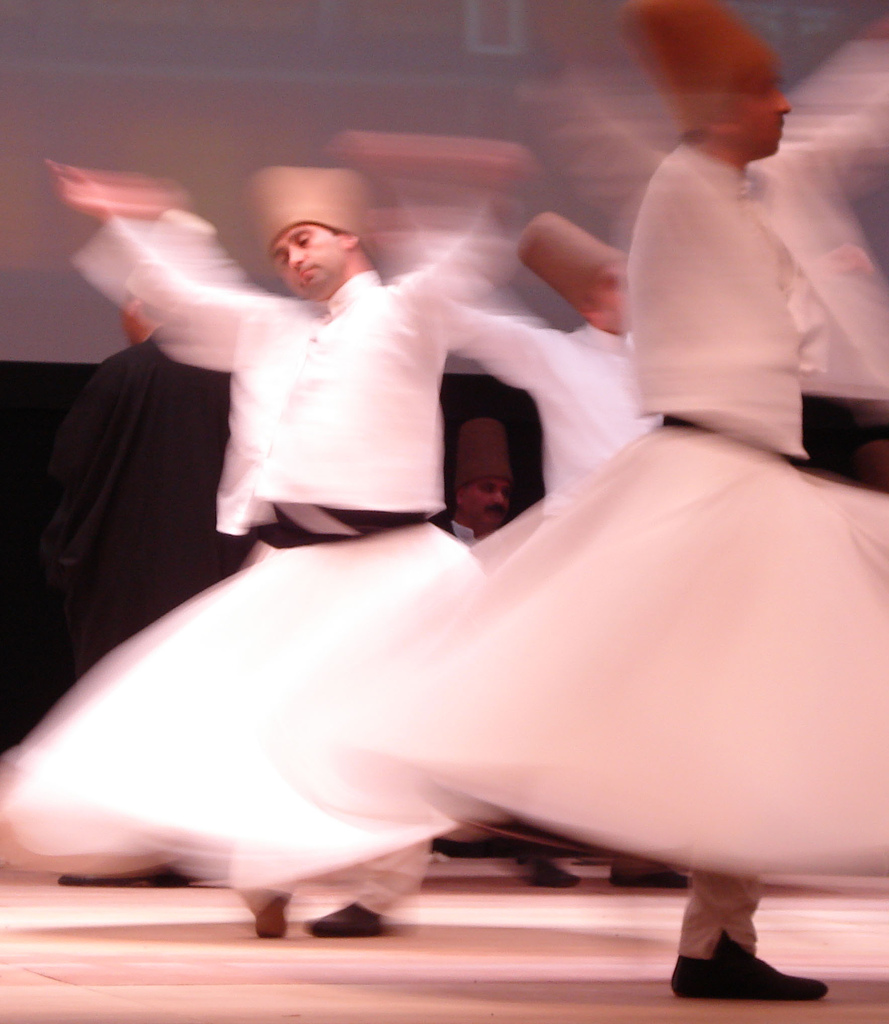
Whirling dervishes

Dhikr (zikr) is a type of meditation within Islam, meaning remembering and mentioning God, which involves the repetition of the 99 Names of God since the 8th or 9th century. It is interpreted in different meditative techniques in Sufism or Islamic mysticism. This became one of the essential elements of Sufism as it was systematized traditionally. It is juxtaposed with fikr (thinking) which leads to knowledge. By the 12th century, the practice of Sufism included specific meditative techniques, and its followers practiced breathing controls and the repetition of holy words.

Sufism uses a meditative procedure like Buddhist concentration, involving high-intensity and sharply focused introspection. In the Oveyssi-Shahmaghsoudi Sufi order, for example, muraqabah takes the form of tamarkoz, "concentration" in Persian.

Tafakkur or tadabbur in Sufism literally means reflection upon the universe: this is considered to permit access to a form of cognitive and emotional development that can emanate only from the higher level, i.e. from God. The sensation of receiving divine inspiration awakens and liberates both heart and intellect, permitting such inner growth that the apparently mundane actually takes on the quality of the infinite. Muslim teachings embrace life as a test of one's submission to God.

Dervishes of certain Sufi orders practice whirling, a form of physically active meditation.

==== Baháʼí Faith ====
In the teachings of the Baháʼí Faith, which derives from an Islamic context but is universalist in orientation, meditation is a primary tool for spiritual development, involving reflection on the words of God. While prayer and meditation are linked, where meditation happens generally in a prayerful attitude, prayer is seen specifically as turning toward God, and meditation is seen as a communion with one's self where one focuses on the divine.

In Baháʼí teachings the purpose of meditation is to strengthen one's understanding of the words of God, and to make one's soul more susceptible to their potentially transformative power, more receptive to the need for both prayer and meditation to bring about and maintain a spiritual communion with God.

Bahá'u'lláh, the founder of the religion, never specified any particular form of meditation, and thus each person is free to choose their own form. However, he did state that Baháʼís should read a passage of the Baháʼí writings twice a day, once in the morning, and once in the evening, and meditate on it. He also encouraged people to reflect on one's actions and worth at the end of each day. During the Nineteen Day Fast, a period of the year during which Baháʼís adhere to a sunrise-to-sunset fast, they meditate and pray to reinvigorate their spiritual forces.

=== Modern spirituality ===
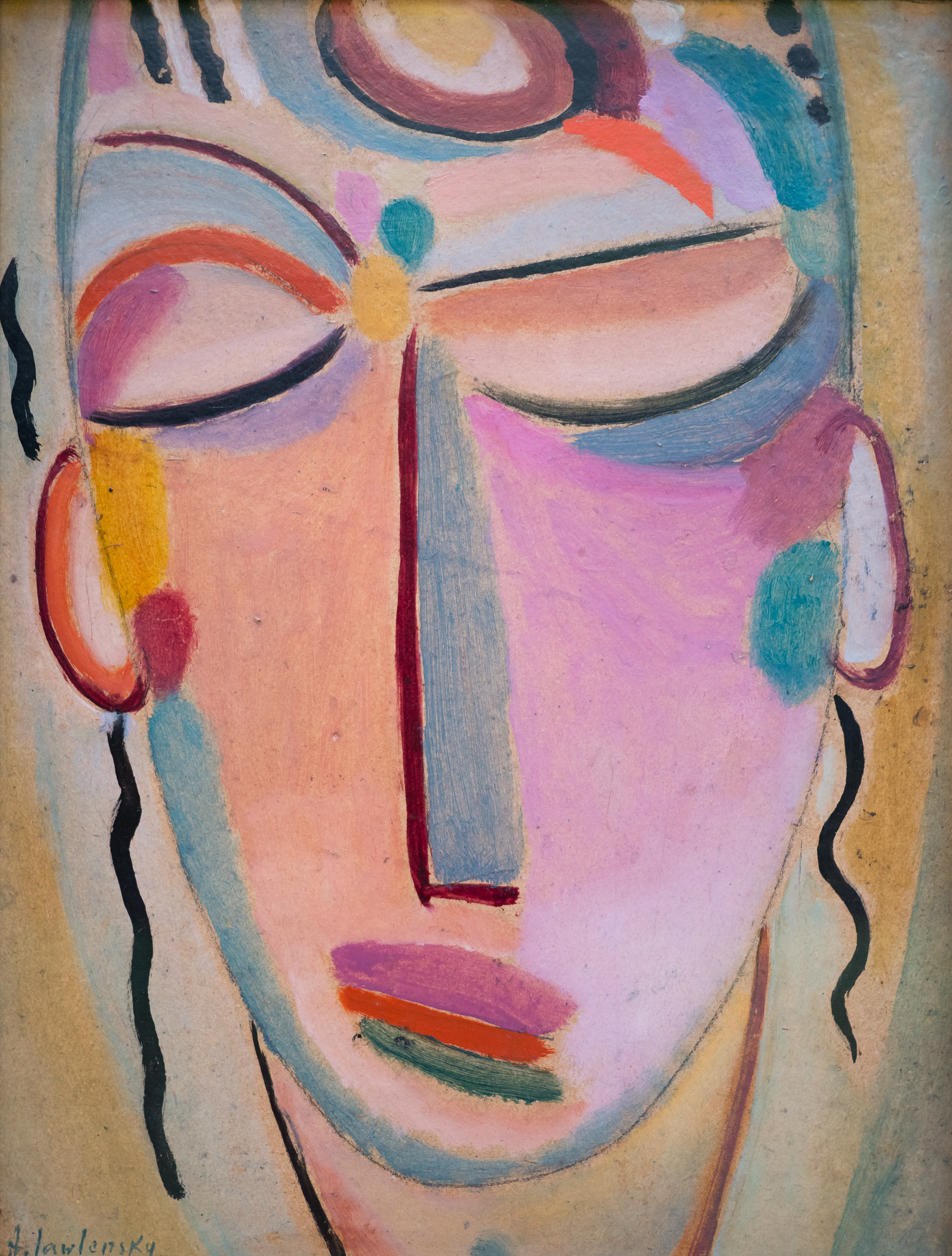
Meditation. Alexej von Jawlensky, 1918

==== Modern dissemination in the West ====
Meditation has spread in the West since the late 19th century, accompanying increased travel and communication among cultures worldwide. Most prominent has been the transmission of Asian-derived practices to the West. In addition, interest in some Western-based meditative practices has been revived, and these have been disseminated to a limited extent to Asian countries.

Ideas about Eastern meditation had begun "seeping into American popular culture even before the American Revolution through the various sects of European occult Christianity", and such ideas "came pouring in [to America] during the era of the transcendentalists, especially between the 1840s and the 1880s." The following decades saw further spread of these ideas to America:

The World Parliament of Religions, held in Chicago in 1893, was the landmark event that increased Western awareness of meditation. This was the first time that Western audiences on American soil received Asian spiritual teachings from Asians themselves. Thereafter, Swami Vivekananda [...] [founded] various Vedanta ashrams [...] Anagarika Dharmapala lectured at Harvard on Theravada Buddhist meditation in 1904; Abdul Baha [...] [toured] the US teaching the principles of Bahai [sic], and Soyen Shaku toured in 1907 teaching Zen.

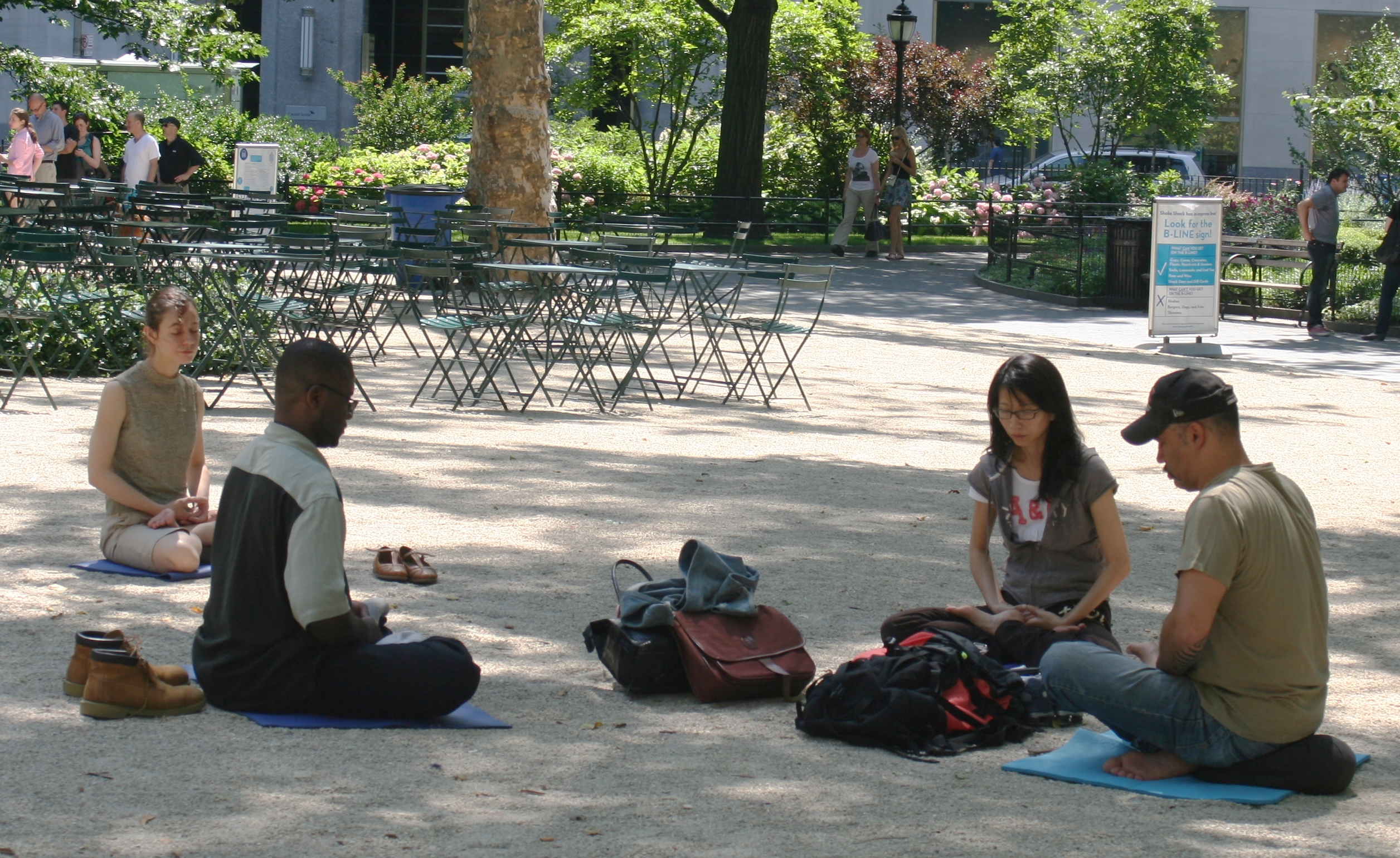
Meditating in Madison Square Park, New York City

More recently, in the 1960s, another surge in Western interest in meditative practices began. The rise of communist political power in Asia led to many Asian spiritual teachers taking refuge in Western countries, oftentimes as refugees. In addition to spiritual forms of meditation, secular forms of meditation have taken root. Rather than focusing on spiritual growth, secular meditation emphasizes stress reduction, relaxation and self-improvement.

The 2012 US National Health Interview Survey of 34,525 subjects found that 8% of US adults used meditation, with lifetime and 12-month prevalence of meditation use of 5.2% and 4.1% respectively. Meditation use among workers was 10% (up from 8% in 2002).

Mantra meditation, with the use of a japa mala and especially with focus on the Hare Krishna maha-mantra, is a central practice of the Gaudiya Vaishnava faith tradition and the International Society for Krishna Consciousness, also known as the Hare Krishna movement. Other popular New Religious Movements include the Ramakrishna Mission, Vedanta Society, Divine Light Mission, Chinmaya Mission, Osho, Sahaja Yoga, Transcendental Meditation, Oneness University, Brahma Kumaris, Vihangam Yoga and Heartfulness Meditation (Sahaj Marg).

==== New Age ====
New Age meditations are often influenced by Eastern philosophy, mysticism, yoga, Hinduism and Buddhism, yet may contain some degree of Western influence. In the West, meditation found its mainstream roots through the social revolution of the 1960s and 1970s, when many of the youth of the day rebelled against traditional western religion as a reaction against what some perceived as the failure of Christianity to provide spiritual and ethical guidance. New Age meditation as practised by the early hippies is regarded for its techniques of blanking out the mind and releasing oneself from religious, politically and socially patterned thinking. This is often aided by repetitive chanting of a mantra, or focusing on an object. New Age meditation evolved into a range of purposes and practices, from serenity and balance, stress management and to access to other realms of consciousness, involving the concentration of energy in group or individual meditation to the supreme goal of samadhi, as in the ancient yogic practice of meditation.

==== Mindfulness ====
The cultivation of mindfulness meditation generally incorporates practices aimed at cultivating prosocial and virtuous qualities, including empathy, compassion, and loving-kindness.

==== Guided meditation ====
Guided meditation is a form of meditation which uses a number of different techniques to achieve or enhance the meditative state. It may simply be meditation done under the guidance of a trained practitioner or teacher, or it may be through the use of imagery, music, and other techniques. The session can be either in person, via media comprising music or verbal instruction, or a combination of both. The most common form is a combination of meditation music and receptive music therapy, guided imagery, relaxation, mindfulness, and journaling.

The term is frequently used interchangeably with "guided imagery" and sometimes with "creative visualization" in popular psychology and self-help literature, and cannot be understood as a single technique, but rather multiple techniques that are integral to its practice.

== Effects ==
Research on the processes and effects of meditation is a subfield of neurological research. Modern scientific techniques, such as functional magnetic resonance imaging and electroencephalography, were used to observe neurological responses during meditation.

Meditation lowers heart rate, oxygen consumption, breathing frequency, stress hormones, lactate levels, and regulates the sympathetic nervous system activity (associated with the fight-or-flight response), along with a modest decline in blood pressure. During meditation, the oxygen consumption decrease averages 10 to 20 percent over the first three minutes. During sleep for example, oxygen consumption decreases around 8 percent over four or five hours. For meditators who have practiced for years, breath rate can drop to three or four breaths per minute and "brain waves slow from the usual beta (seen in waking activity) or alpha (seen in normal relaxation) to much slower delta and theta waves". Recent meta-analyses indicate that meditation and mindfulness practices, can significantly reduce blood pressure and improve cardiovascular biomarkers by reducing sympathetic nervous system activity, regulating cortisol, and decreasing inflammation.

Studies demonstrate that meditation practices may significantly improve pain measures, quality of life, and mental health outcomes in people with chronic pain.

Meditation has also been found to support the development of psychological resilience. Regular practice can help individuals manage chronic stress, trauma, and emotional challenges by fostering greater emotional regulation, reducing rumination, and enhancing adaptive coping strategies.

== "Challenging" and adverse effects ==
Some cross-sectional surveys indicate that meditation may induce "challenging" and "unwanted" experiences. However, the studies could not establish a causal relationship between meditation and the reported adverse effects, since they were cross-sectional and included only participants who reported negative experiences. Another investigation indicated that the strongest risk factors associated with negative experiences in meditation were having attempted divine, magical, or occult practices, psychedelic use, and contemplation of mysteries. This study also found that mindfulness meditation techniques are not associated with negative experiences. Other studies also indicate that the standard, widely implemented Mindfulness-Based Stress Reduction (MBSR) program does not result in harm, with some research additionally suggesting that mindfulness meditation may even protect against multiple forms of harm.

=== Common adverse effects ===
Adverse psychological symptoms may include depersonalization, an altered sense of self or the world, distorted emotions or thoughts, and auditory and visual hallucinations. In extreme cases in patients with underlying undiagnosed or historical emotional conditions there have been instances of self-harm. There are also reports of narcissistic and sociopathic behaviour.

=== Frequency ===
According to Farias et al. (2020) there is a prevalence of 8.3% adverse effects, "similar to those reported for psychotherapy practice in general." Schlosser et al. (2019) reported that of 1,232 regular meditators with at least two months of meditation experience, about a quarter reported having had particularly unpleasant meditation-related experiences which they thought may have been caused by their meditation practice.

=== Comorbidity and causal factors ===
According to Schlosser et al. (2019), "preliminary findings suggest that their occurrence is highly dependent on a complex interaction of contextual factors." Meditation-related psychosis has been linked to sleep deprivation, preceding mental dispositions, and meditation without sufficient social support or any explanatory framework.

According to Farias et al. (2020), the most common adverse effects are in people with a history of anxiety and depression. However, according to Farias et al. (2020), "minor adverse effects have been observed in individuals with no previous history of mental health problems") Farias et al. (2020) further note that "it is also possible that participants predisposed to heightened levels of anxiety and depression are more likely to begin or maintain a meditation practice to manage their symptoms."

Meditators with high levels of repetitive negative thinking, forced breathing causing hypoxia and those who only engage in deconstructive meditation (vipassana/insight meditation) were more likely to report unpleasant side effects.

=== Supportive explanatory framework ===
Schlosser et al. "found strong evidence that religious participants have lower odds of having particularly unpleasant meditation-related experiences," and "found weak evidence that female participants were less likely to have unpleasant meditation-related experiences," and note the importance of "understanding when these experiences are constitutive elements of meditative practice rather than merely negative effects."

A number of Western Buddhist teachers and leaders have asserted that proper instruction from a legitimate, genuinely insightful teacher prevents negative experiences in meditation from escalating into adverse or harmful effects. For example, studies indicate that people who experience adverse effects as fleeting emotions (i.e., seeing them as a passing phase) without identifying with these experiences, are able to overcome distress. Further, balancing concentration practices with open-monitoring practices, incorporating loving-kindness meditation, and even adding physical activity may help prevent any negative experiences from escalating into harmful effects. It has been proposed that a lack of understanding of the theoretical basis of meditation may also play a major causal role in the development of adverse effects. Studies on adverse effects have additionally found that participants who experience these effects are just as glad to have practiced meditation as those who do not, and that they continue to view meditation as a valuable activity that supports their mental wellbeing. It is worth noting that others have further indicated that while secular mindfulness can provide demonstrable benefits such as stress reduction and psychological relief, these benefits should not be confused with the much more profound transformation explained in Buddhist teachings.

=== Historical descriptions ===
Difficult experiences encountered in meditation are mentioned in traditional sources, and some may be considered to be an expected part of the process. According to Salguero,

Problematic experiences such as strange sensations, unexplained pains, psychological instability, undesired hallucinations, sexual anomalies, uncontrollable behaviors, demonic possession, suicidality, and so forth seem to be quite well-known and well-documented across traditions.

The Qigong-tradition knows zouhuorumo (Chinese: 走火入魔), psychological and somatic symptoms including mental and physical agitation and pain, thought disorder in severe cases and other neurological symptoms such as altered sensation.

The Visuddhimagga mentions various unpleasant stages, and possible "unwholesome or frightening visions" are mentioned in Practical Insight Meditation: Basic and Progressive Stages, a practical manual on vipassanā meditation by Mahāsi Sayādaw.

Classical Zen Buddhist sources mention makyō, Zen sickness (Chinese and Japanese: 禪病; pinyin: Chánbìng; rōmaji: Zenbyō) and related difficulties, such as zouhuorumo (走火入魔; 'fire possession'), and mojing (魔境; 'demonic states'). Traditional sources also precribe cures against these experiences, for example Hakuin Ekaku's treatment of Zen-sickness.

=== Medical and psychological support ===
Adverse effects can be quite perplexing and burdensome. By extension this problem is compounded with little or no accessible support or explanatory framework for novice or laity practitioners to know when it is appropriate to self manage or when it is advisable to seek professional advice on practice or the management or intervention on adverse symptomatology that may arise in this field of self-cultivation .

== Secular applications ==
=== Psychotherapy ===
Carl Jung (1875–1961) was an early western explorer of eastern religious practices. He clearly advocated ways to increase the conscious awareness of an individual. Yet he expressed some caution concerning a westerner's direct immersion in eastern practices without some prior appreciation of the differing spiritual and cultural contexts. Erich Fromm (1900–1980) later explored spiritual practices of the east.

=== Clinical ===
Since the 1970s, clinical psychology and psychiatry have developed meditation techniques for numerous psychological conditions. Mindfulness practice is employed in psychology to alleviate mental and physical conditions, such as affecting the endocrine system therefore reducing depression, and helping to alleviate stress, and anxiety. Mindfulness is also used as a form of interventional therapy in the treatment of addiction including drug addiction, although the quantity and quality of evidence based research has been poor.

The US National Center for Complementary and Integrative Health states that "Meditation and mindfulness practices may have a variety of health benefits and may help people improve the quality of their lives. Recent studies have investigated if meditation or mindfulness helps people manage anxiety, stress, depression, pain, or symptoms related to withdrawal from nicotine, alcohol, or opioids." However, the NCCIC goes on to caution that, "results from the studies have been difficult to analyze and may have been interpreted too optimistically."

A 2014 review by Goyal et al. Examined 47 studies involving 3.515 participants to better understand how meditation affects psychological health. The researchers found moderate evidence that mindfulness meditation programs could help reduce symptoms of anxiety and depression, with some benefits continuing for three to six months. However, the evidence for reducing general stress and psychological distress was less clear. The researchers also pointed out that meditation was not shown to be more effective than other treatments, such as exercise, medication, or behavioral therapy. These findings suggest that mindfulness meditation may be a helpful way to support mental health, but more research is still needed to understand its long-term effects. In 2017, the American Heart Association issued a scientific statement that meditation may be a reasonable adjunct practice and intervention to help reduce the risk of cardiovascular diseases, with the qualification that meditation needs to be better defined in higher-quality clinical research of these disorders. Recent findings have also found evidence of meditation affecting migraines in adults. Mindfulness meditation may allow for a decrease in migraine episodes, and a drop in migraine medication usage.

Early low-quality and low- quantity evidence indicates that the mechanism of meditation may help with irritable bowel syndrome, insomnia, cognitive decline in the elderly, and post-traumatic stress disorder. Sitting in silence, body scan meditation and concentrating on breathing was shown in a 2016 review to moderately decrease symptoms of PTSD and depression in war veterans and creating resilience to stresses in active service. Researchers have found that participating in mindfulness meditation can aid insomnia patients by improving sleep quality and total wake time. Mindfulness meditation is a supportive therapy that aides in the treatment for patients diagnosed with insomnia.

=== In the workplace ===
A 2010 review of the literature on spirituality and performance in organizations found an increase in corporate meditation programs.

As of 2016 around a quarter of U.S. employers were using stress reduction initiatives. The goal was to help reduce stress and improve reactions to stress. Aetna now offers its program to its customers. Google also implements mindfulness, offering more than a dozen meditation courses, with the most prominent one, "Search Inside Yourself", having been implemented since 2007. General Mills offers the Mindful Leadership Program Series, a course which uses a combination of mindfulness meditation, yoga and dialogue with the intention of developing the mind's capacity to pay attention. Research indicates that workplace mindfulness programs may contribute to improved employee mental health and retention.

Many military organizations around the world have found meditation and mindfulness practice can support a range of benefits related to combat, including support for mental health, mental clarity, focus and stress control.

=== In school ===
A review of 15 peer-reviewed studies of youth meditation in schools indicated transcendental meditation a moderate effect on wellbeing and a small effect on social competence. Insufficient research has been done on the effect of meditation on academic achievement. A 2026 systematic review of mindfulness programs for children and adolescents found small, mostly short-term improvements in wellbeing and mental health, seen mainly when compared with no program and with no clear advantage over other structured school activities. Evidence has also shown possible improvement to stress, cognitive performance in school taught meditation.

Positive effects on emotion regulation, stress and anxiety can also be seen in students in university and nursing.

=== Relaxation response and biofeedback ===
Herbert Benson of Harvard Medical School conducted a series of clinical tests on meditators from various disciplines, including the Transcendental Meditation technique and Tibetan Buddhism. In 1975, Benson published a book titled The Relaxation Response where he outlined his own version of meditation for relaxation. Also in the 1970s, the American psychologist Patricia Carrington developed a similar technique called Clinically Standardized Meditation (CSM). In Norway, another sound-based method called Acem Meditation developed a psychology of meditation and has been the subject of several scientific studies.

Biofeedback has been used by many researchers since the 1950s in an effort to enter deeper states of mind.

== See also ==
- Altered state of consciousness – Any condition that is significantly different from a normal waking state
- Autogenic training – Relaxation technique
- Ego death – Complete loss of subjective self-identity
- Flow – Full immersion in an activity
- Four foundations of mindfulness – Mindfulness in Buddhism
- Hypnosis – State of increased suggestibility
- Immanence – Belief that the divine encompasses or is manifested in the material world
- Mechanisms of mindfulness meditation
- Mindfulness – Secular meditation practice
- Mushin (mental state) – State of mind in East Asian culture
- Narrative identity – Psychological theory
- Psychology of religion – Analytic approach to religion
- Sensory deprivation – Deliberate reduction or removal of stimuli
- Tukdam – Buddhist post-mortem meditation
- Vipassana – Buddhist meditation practices

== Sources ==
Printed sources

- Aguirre B (2018), Mindfulness and Meditation: Your Questions Answered, ABC-CLIO
- Benson H, Klipper MZ (2000) [1972]. The Relaxation Response. Harper. ISBN 0-380-81595-8.
- Bond K, Ospina MB, Hooton N, et al. (2009). "Defining a complex intervention: The development of demarcation criteria for 'meditation'". Psychology of Religion and Spirituality. 1 (2): 129–137. doi:10.1037/a0015736. (NB: Bond et al. (2009) has substantial overlap with the full report by Ospina et al. (2007), listed below. Overlap includes the first 6 authors of this paper, and the equivalence of Table 3 on p. 134 in this paper with Table B1 on p. 281 in the full report)
- Bodhi B (1999). The Noble Eightfold Path: The Way to the End of Suffering. Archived from the original on 28 August 2019.
- Bodhi B (2005), In the Buddha's Words: An Anthology of Discourses from the Pali Canon, Simon and Schuster
- Bronkhorst J (1993), The Two Traditions Of Meditation In Ancient India, Motilal Banarsidass Publ.
- Cahn BR, Polich J (2006). "Meditation states and traits: EEG, ERP, and neuroimaging studies". Psychological Bulletin. 132 (2): 180–211. doi:10.1037/0033-2909.132.2.180. PMID 16536641. S2CID 2151810.
- Chan-Ob T, Boonyanaruthee V (1999). "Meditation in association with psychosis". Journal of the Medical Association of Thailand. 82 (9). Chotmaihet Thangphaet: 925–30. ISSN 0125-2208. PMID 10561951.
- Dhavamony M (1982). Classical Hinduism. Università Gregoriana Editrice. ISBN 978-88-7652-482-0. Archived from the original on 17 March 2023.
- Everly GS, Lating JM (2002), A clinical guide to the treatment of human stress response, Springer Science & Business Media, ISBN 0-306-46620-1
- Epstein M (1995). Thought without a Thinker: Psychotherapy from a Buddhist Perspective. Basic Books.
- Farias M, Maraldi E, Wallenkampf KC, et al. (2020). "Adverse events in meditation practices and meditation-based therapies: a systematic review". Acta Psychiatrica Scandinavica. 142 (5): 374–393. doi:10.1111/acps.13225. PMID 32820538.
- Fischer-Schreiber I, Ehrhard FK, Diener MS, eds. (1991). The Shambhala Dictionary of Buddhism and Zen. Shambhala Publications.
- Gangadharan S, Hemamalini M (2021), Community Health Nursing: Framework for Practice: Vol 2-E-Book, Elsevier Health Sciences
- Gethin R (1998). The foundations of Buddhism. Oxford: Oxford University Press. ISBN 0-19-289223-1.
- Goldstein J (2003). One Dharma: the emerging Western Buddhism. New York: Harper Collins. ISBN 0-06-251701-5.
- Goleman D (1988). The meditative mind: The varieties of meditative experience. New York: Tarcher. ISBN 978-0-87477-833-5.
- Goud SS (2022). "A Double-Edged Sword-A Case Report of Psychosis Associated with Excessive Unguided Meditation". Case Reports in Psychiatry. 2022 (2661824). doi:10.1155/2022/2661824. PMC 9617715. PMID 36316997.
- Jevning R, Wallace R, Beidebach M (September 1992). "The physiology of meditation: A review. A wakeful hypometabolic integrated response". Neuroscience & Biobehavioral Reviews. 16 (3): 415–424. doi:10.1016/s0149-7634(05)80210-6. PMID 1528528. S2CID 2650109.
- Kamalashila (2003), Meditation: The Buddhist art of tranquility and insight, Birmingham: Windhorse Publications
- Kaplan A (1978). Meditation and the Bible. Maine: Samuel Weiser.
- Kaplan A (1982). Meditation and Kabbalah. Maine: Samuel Weiser.
- Kapleau P (1989). The three pillars of Zen: teaching, practice, and enlightenment (25th anniversary ed.). New York: Anchor Books. ISBN 0-385-26093-8.
- Lai W, Cheng Yy (2008), "Chinese Buddhist Philosophy from Han through Tang", in Mou B (ed.), The Routledge History of Chinese Philosophy, Routledge
- Larson GJ (2008). The Encyclopedia of Indian Philosophies: Yoga: India's philosophy of meditation. Motilal Banarsidass. ISBN 978-81-208-3349-4.
- Lindahl J, Fisher N, Cooper D (2017). "The varieties of contemplative experience: A mixed-methods study of meditation-related challenges in Western Buddhists". PLOS ONE. 12 (5) e0176239. Bibcode:2017PLoSO..1276239L. doi:10.1371/journal.pone.0176239. PMC 5443484. PMID 28542181.
- Lusthaus D (2018), Samkhya, acmuller.net, Resources for East Asian Language and Thought, Musashino University
- Matko K, Sedlmeier P (15 October 2019), "What Is Meditation? Proposing an Empirically Derived Classification System", Front. Psychol., 10 (Sec. Cognition): 2276, doi:10.3389/fpsyg.2019.02276, PMC 6803504, PMID 31681085
- McRae J (1986), The Northern School and the Formation of Early Chʻan Buddhism, University of Hawaii Press
- Naranjo C, Ornstein RE (1972) [1971]. On the psychology of meditation. A Viking compass book. New York: The Viking Press. ISBN 978-0-670-52506-5. LCCN 76149720.
- Ospina MB, Bond K, Karkhaneh M, et al. (June 2007). "Meditation practices for health: state of the research". Evidence Report/Technology Assessment (155): 1–263. PMC 4780968. PMID 17764203.
- Perez-De-Albeniz A, Holmes J (2000). "Meditation: Concepts, Effects And Uses In Therapy". International Journal of Psychotherapy. 5 (1): 49–58. doi:10.1080/13569080050020263.
- Polak G (2011), Reexamining Jhana: Towards a Critical Reconstruction of Early Buddhist Soteriology, UMCS
- Salguero CP (2023). ""Meditation Sickness" in Medieval Chinese Buddhism and the Contemporary West" (PDF). Journal of Buddhist Ethics. 30 (2): 169–211. ISSN 1076-9005. Archived (PDF) from the original on 3 June 2024.
- Schaik Sv (2018), The spirit of Zen, Yale University Press
- Schlosser M, Sparby T, Vörös S, et al. (2019). "Unpleasant meditation-related experiences in regular meditators: Prevalence, predictors, and conceptual considerations". PLOS ONE. 14 (5) e0216643. Bibcode:2019PLoSO..1416643S. doi:10.1371/journal.pone.0216643. PMC 6508707. PMID 31071152.
- Schlosser M (2022). "Defining Meditation: Foundations for an Activity-Based Phenomenological Classification System". Frontiers in Psychology. 12 795077. doi:10.3389/fpsyg.2021.795077. PMC 8832115. PMID 35153920.
- Shapiro DH (1982). "Overview: Clinical and physiological comparison of meditation with other self-control strategies". American Journal of Psychiatry. 139 (3): 267–74. doi:10.1176/ajp.139.3.267. PMID 7036760. Reprinted as chapter 1 (pp. 5–10) in Shapiro DH, Walsh RN (1984). Meditation, classic and contemporary perspectives. New York: Aldine. ISBN 978-0-202-25136-3. Archived from the original on 17 March 2023. (the book was republished in 2008: ISBN 978-0-202-36244-1, 0-202-36244-2)
- Sharf R (2014), "Mindfulness and Mindlessness in Early Chan", Philosophy East & West, 64 (4): 933–964, doi:10.1353/pew.2014.0074, S2CID 144208166
- Sharf RH (2015), "Is mindfulness Buddhist? (and why it matters)", Transcultural Psychiatry, 52 (4): 470–484, doi:10.1177/1363461514557561, PMID 25361692, S2CID 18518975, archived from the original on 17 March 2023
- Suzuki D (2014), Selected Works of D.T. Suzuki, Volume I: Zen, University of California Press
- Taylor E (1999). Murphy M, Donovan S, Taylor E (eds.). "Introduction". The Physical and Psychological Effects of Meditation: A Review of Contemporary Research with a Comprehensive Bibliography 1931–1996: 1–32. Archived from the original on 13 October 2016.
- Thera N (1996). The Heart of Buddhist Meditation: A Handbook of Mental Training based on the Buddha's Way of Mindfulness. York Beach, ME: Samuel Weiser. ISBN 0-87728-073-8.
- Vetter T (1988), The Ideas and Meditative Practices of Early Buddhism, BRILL
- Vörös S (2016). "Sitting with the Demons – Mindfulness, Suffering, and Existential Transformation". Asian Studies. 4 (2): 59–83. doi:10.4312/as.2016.4.2.59-83.
- Walsh R, Shapiro SL (2006). "The meeting of meditative disciplines and western psychology: A mutually enriching dialogue". American Psychologist. 61 (3): 227–239. doi:10.1037/0003-066X.61.3.227. PMID 16594839. S2CID 3015768.
- Yadav J, Bhardwaj A, Jangid P, et al. (2023). "Meditation-A Slippery Slope for Psychosis: A Case Series With Review of Evidence". The Journal of Nervous and Mental Disease. 211 (8): 634–638. doi:10.1097/NMD.0000000000001656. PMID 37505896.
- Yu J (2021), Reimagining Chan Buddhism: Sheng Yen and the Creation of the Dharma Drum Lineage of Chan, Routledge

Web sources
