= Acem Meditation =

Meditation technique

Acem Meditation is a meditation technique developed in Norway since 1966 by the Acem School of Meditation and is now taught in many countries.

It is non-religious, and its effects are attributed to psychological and physiological mechanisms. It is process-oriented, correct meditation being defined in terms of practice rather than experiences or states of mind. In contrast to many other forms of meditation, it makes no use of concentration, but instead allows spontaneous thoughts to come and go during the practice. According to Acem, this increases relaxation effects and stimulates long-term processes of personal growth.

== Technique ==
Acem Meditation involves the mental repetition of a simple sound, called a meditation sound, a meaningless combination of vowels and consonants which is believed to help mind and body relax and to bring unconscious material closer to consciousness.

The way the meditator repeats the meditation sound is considered to be of paramount importance: the sound should be repeated with a so-called 'free mental attitude', i.e., in an effortless manner which does not require concentration and which allows thoughts, feelings and other impulses to come and go freely; forgetting the sound from time to time because one is absorbed by spontaneous thoughts is considered a central part of the technique.

In keeping with this emphasis on a free mental attitude, Acem does not recommend any meditation position that strains the body. The meditator should sit comfortably with good support for the lower back. Meditation habits vary, but for long-term results 30 minutes twice a day or 45 minutes once a day is recommended.

Acem Meditation offers beginner's courses, courses for established meditators, and retreats with long meditations. These courses emphasise group dynamics and encourage discussion of one's practice. Individual or group guidance is seen as a help to increase the effect of meditation, and sometimes provides opportunities for discussion of central life issues, which are believed to be reflected in one's meditative practice.

Long meditations (i.e. meditations of more than an hour) followed by guidance are believed to provide deeper relaxation and increase the potential for personal growth. Most Acem centres arrange meetings with meditations of 1½ to 2 hours. At retreats, the length of time is increased beyond the 3-hour level, and at so-called deepening retreats beyond the 6-hour level.

== Research ==
In recent years, an increasing amount of research has been carried out on the psychological and physiological effects of meditation techniques in general and of Acem Meditation in particular.

In his 2004 doctoral thesis from the Faculty of Medicine, University of Oslo, Norway, Dr. Erik Ekker Solberg explored the psychobiological effects of Acem Meditation. One of his studies shows that Acem Meditation reduces heart rate, blood pressure, and muscular tension. The heart rate reduction is stronger and more stable than at ordinary rest. A slow heart rate is usually considered to indicate relaxation. Dr. Solberg's research also suggests that advanced meditators have higher melatonin levels than non-meditators (though melatonin decreases during long meditation), possibly an effect of long-term relaxation.

In a study of performance under stress, marksmen who had learned Acem Meditation improved their results in competition marksmanship, compared to a control group that did not learn meditation, indicating that Acem Meditation reduces the level of stress in tense and demanding situations. Another study showed that the meditators had significantly lower blood lactate concentration after physical exercise than the control group, indicating faster recovery.

In a study on the effect of meditation on immune cells, Erik Solberg found that long term practice of meditation may influence absolute lymphocyte counts at rest. Runners practising meditation had lower lymphocyte counts at rest before the race.

== Effects ==
Relaxation is presented as a basic effect of Acem Meditation. The beneficial effects of the technique on insomnia, concentration problems, headaches and other bodily symptoms, social relations etc. are seen as extensions of the relaxation response elicited by the practice. Acem Meditation is often used as a tool in stress management, and Acem also arranges courses specifically designed to deal with stress.

For regular practitioners, however, Acem Meditation is typically seen as a method for long-term personal growth rather than just a relaxation technique. According to Acem's psychology of meditation, meditation may help the individual to overcome some of the limitations set by his or her personality, leading to a freer frame of mind and a higher degree of receptivity and sensitivity. The same limitations that create problems for the person in his everyday life will also at times influence his meditation practice. For instance, a tense person may repeat the meditation sound too forcefully, while an evasive person may tend to be more passive in his meditation. Adjusting one's meditative practice is seen as a means to overcome such limitations, not only in meditation, but also in everyday life. The most important elements in Acem's psychological understanding of the technique are explained in the book "Inner Strength — the free mental attitude in Acem Meditation".

== History ==
Are Holen learned deep meditation (later called Transcendental Meditation) from Mahesh Yogi in 1962 and in January 1966 founded the Academic Meditation Society, precursor to the Acem School of Meditation, at the University of Oslo. At first, he represented Mahesh Yogi in Norway, but Acem soon distanced itself from the transcendental meditation movement due to disagreements about methods and ideology.

== Main office and retreat centers ==
Acems head office is in Oslo. The organization has two international retreat centers, Halvorsbøle at Jevnaker, 70 km from Oslo, and Lundsholm, close to Arvika in Sweden, 150 km from Oslo and 370 km from Stockholm.

== Literature ==
Acem Meditation — an introductory companion, Acem Publishing, ISBN 82-91405-13-1
Inner Strength — the free mental attitude of Acem Meditation, Acem Publishing, ISBN 82-91405-09-3
Fighting Stress — Reviews of meditation research, Edited by Svend Davanger, Halvor Eifring and Anne Grete Hersoug, ISBN 978-82-91405-16-2
Psychology of Silence — Perspectives on Acem meditation, ISBN 978-82-91405-32-2
The Power of the Wandering Mind — Nondirective Meditation in Science and Philosophy, ISBN 978-82-91405-55-1
