= The Varieties of the Meditative Experience =

Book by Daniel Goleman

- Cover of the first edition
- Author: Daniel Goleman
- Language: English
- Publisher: Tarcher/G. P. Putnam
- Publication date: 1977/1988
- Media type: Print
- Pages: 214
- ISBN: 0-87477-833-6

The Varieties of the Meditative Experience is a 1977 book by American psychologist Daniel Goleman. It was republished under the title The Meditative Mind in 1988.

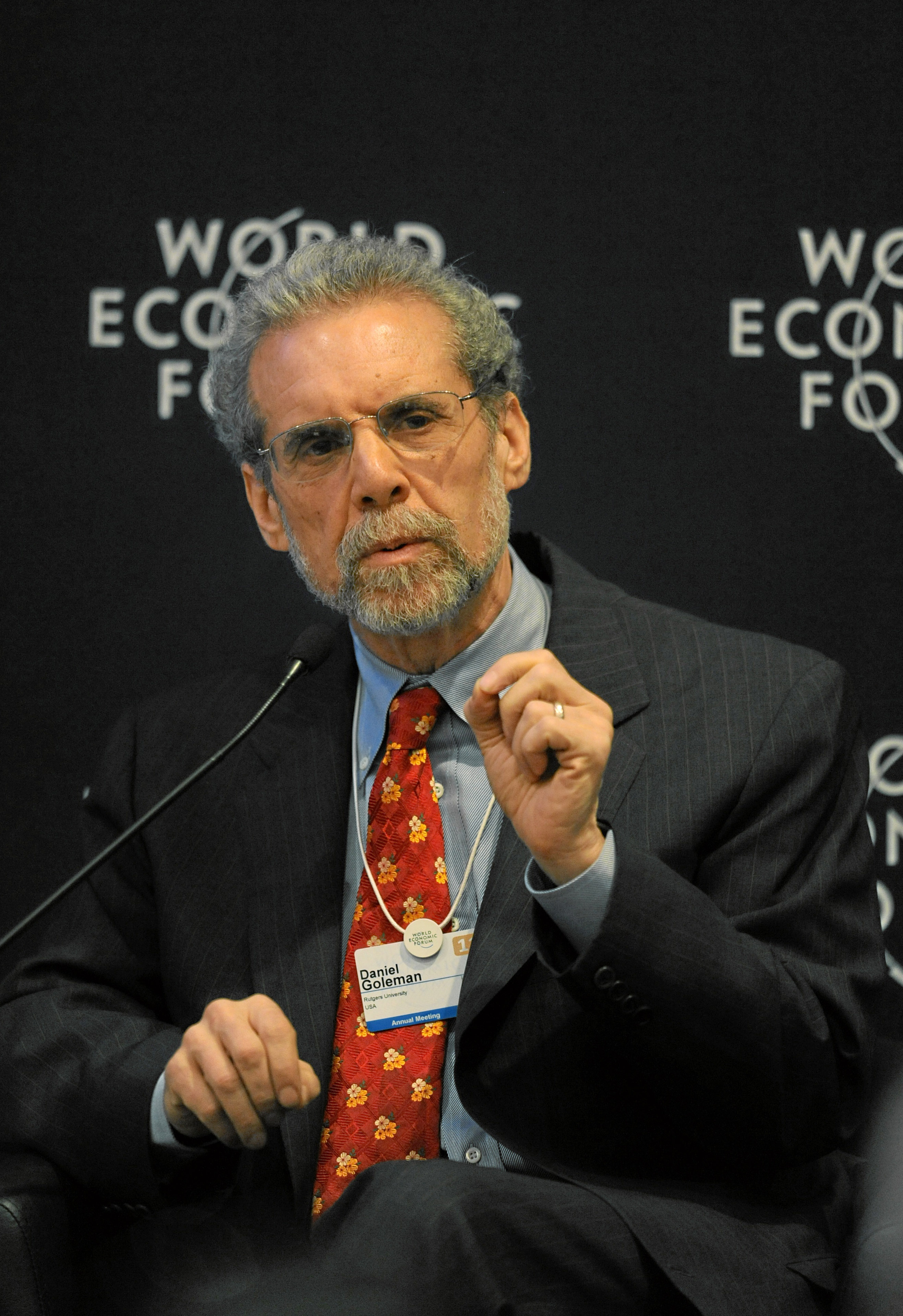
The author, Daniel Goleman, in 2011

== Synopsis ==
=== Visuddhimagga ===
Goleman begins with an outline of the Visuddhimagga of Theravadan Buddhism.

=== Survey ===
Goleman continues with a survey of eleven types of meditation including Hinduism, Judaism, Christianity, Sufism, Transcendental Meditation, Patanjali's Ashtanga Yoga, Indian Tantra and Kundalini Yoga, Tibetan Buddhism, Zen, the teachings of Gurdjieff as expressed by P. D. Ouspensky, and the teachings of Jiddu Krishnamurti.

=== Unity ===
Goleman then draws some parallels between various methods, saying that they all share the goal of changing the practitioner's state of consciousness. Each method may have a different word for the "awakened state": sahaj samadhi, Devekut, purity of heart, baqa, jivamukti, cosmic consciousness, turiyatita, siddha, bodhisattva, mujodo no taigeu, objective consciousness, choiceless awareness, arahantship. All of them result in one, single point of concentration. All except Krishnamurti propose an explicit doctrine that the student is expected to assimilate.

=== Abhidhamma model ===
Next the author reviews Theravadan Buddhism's Abhidhamma which describes, in 53 categories (and in other schools of Buddhism up to 175 categories), how wholesome states of mind replace and cancel out unwholesome ones. Which traits are wholesome was distilled empirically from a survey of a large number of early Buddhists who were asked whether each trait facilitated or detracted from their meditation efforts. Goleman writes, "Each of the unhealthy factors is opposed by a healthy factor."

=== Eastern and Western psychology ===
This becomes a basis for contrast between Eastern and Western psychology. According to Goleman, Westerners study psychopathology, and the English language lacks the words needed to indicate nuances in consciousness.

Goleman searches through modern Western psychology and finds Sigmund Freud failed to ever read and study Eastern texts, and that behaviorist John B. Watson bemoaned what he saw as the substitution of consciousness for soul. Goleman writes, "For the most part, Western psychologists have been reactive against Eastern psychologies". More in tune are parts of Gordon Allport, Erik Erikson, Ernest Becker, and Franz Alexander.

Goleman finds parallels with Eastern psychologies in Plotinus and in Christian psychology in the writings of Anthony the Great, St. John of the Cross and Meister Eckhart. He finds a sympathetic ear in William James, Carl Jung, Abraham Maslow, Andras Angyal, Medard Boss, Martin Buber, Erich Fromm, and in Alan Watts, Anthony Sutich, Charles Tart and in contemporary works by Ken Wilber, Jack Engler, Daniel P. Brown, and Mark Epstein.

=== Conclusion ===
Goleman quickly covers contemporary research on meditation and also research on relaxation. He ends with a discussion of "how to meditate".

== Reaction ==
Publishers Weekly wrote about the 1977 book:

To a casual reader, Goleman's study is too full of arcane words and multilingual jargon about states of enlightenment. But to a serious student of meditation, this book, like its predecessor, is an excellent resource.

Apple iTunes says the 1988 book is "a comprehensive and easily accessed overview".
