= Emotional aperture =

Interpersonal skill

Emotional aperture has been defined as the ability to perceive features of group emotions. This skill involves the perceptual ability to adjust one's focus from a single individual's emotional cues to the broader patterns of shared emotional cues that comprise the emotional composition of the collective.

Some examples of features of group emotions include the level of variability of emotions among members (i.e., affective diversity), the proportion of positive or negative emotions, and the modal (i.e., most common) emotion present in a group. The term “emotional aperture” was first defined by the social psychologist, Jeffrey Sanchez-Burks, and organizational theorist, Quy Huy. It has since been referenced in related work such as in psychologist, journalist, and author of the popular book Emotional Intelligence Daniel Goleman's most recent book "Focus: The Hidden Driver of Excellence." Academic references to emotional aperture and related work can be found on the references site for the Consortium for Research on Emotional Intelligence in Organizations.

Emotional Aperture abilities have been measured using the EAM. The EAM consists of a series of short movie clip showing groups that have various brief reactions to an unspecified event. Following each movie clip, individuals are asked to report the proportion of individuals that had a positive or negative reaction.

Emotional aperture, the ability to pick up such subtle signals in a group, works on essentially the same principle as the aperture of a camera, so he says. We can zoom in to focus on a person's feelings, or, conversely, zoom out to encompass everyone gathered - whether it's a school class or a workgroup. This concept is closely linked to emotional intelligence since it includes abilities such as the ability to develop motivation and persistence. Aperture enables managers to read information more accurately and understand, for example, whether their proposal is met with enthusiasm or rejection. Accurate perception of these signals can prevent failure and help make useful adjustments during project implementation.

== Origin ==
The construct, emotional aperture, was developed to address the need to expand existing models of individual emotion perception (e.g., emotional intelligence) to take into account the veracity of group-based emotions and their action tendencies.

== See also ==
- Social intelligence
