= Buddhism and science =

Relation between Buddhism and modern scientific methods and modes of thought

The relationship between Buddhism and science is a subject of contemporary discussion and debate among Buddhists, scientists, and scholars of Buddhism. Historically, Buddhism encompasses many types of beliefs, traditions and practices, so it is difficult to assert any single "Buddhism" in relation to science. Similarly, the issue of what "science" refers to remains a subject of debate, and there is no single view on this issue. Those who compare science with Buddhism may use "science" to refer to "a method of sober and rational investigation" or may refer to specific scientific theories, methods or technologies.

There are many examples throughout Buddhism of beliefs such as dogmatism, fundamentalism, clericalism, and devotion to supernatural spirits and deities. Nevertheless, since the 19th century, numerous modern figures have argued that Buddhism is rational and uniquely compatible with science. Some have even argued that Buddhism is "scientific" (a kind of "science of the mind" or an "inner science"). Those who argue that Buddhism is aligned with science point out certain commonalities between the scientific method and Buddhist thought. The 14th Dalai Lama, for example, in a speech to the Society for Neuroscience, listed a "suspicion of absolutes" and a reliance on causality and empiricism as common philosophical principles shared by Buddhism and science.

Buddhists also point to various statements in the Buddhist scriptures that promote rational and empirical investigation and invite people to put the teachings of the Buddha to the test before accepting them. Furthermore, Buddhist doctrines such as impermanence and emptiness have been compared to the scientific understanding of the natural world. However, some scholars have criticized the idea that Buddhism is uniquely rational and science friendly, seeing these ideas as a minor element of traditional Buddhism. Scholars like Donald Lopez Jr. have also argued that this narrative of Buddhism as rationalistic developed recently, as a part of a Buddhist modernism that arose from the encounter between Buddhism and western thought.

Furthermore, while some have compared Buddhist ideas to modern theories of evolution, quantum theory, and cosmology, other figures such as the 14th Dalai Lama have also highlighted the methodological and metaphysical differences between these traditions. For the Dalai Lama, Buddhism mainly focuses on studying consciousness from the first-person or phenomenological perspective, while science focuses on studying the objective world.

== Pre-modern Buddhism ==
=== Rational inquiry in Buddhist texts ===
Some modern commentators assert that Buddhist texts contain ideas which share commonalities with modern scientific methods, such as encouraging an impartial investigation of nature (an activity referred to as dhamma-vicaya in the Pali Canon) — the principal object of study being the nature of one's mind or self.

Several passages from the Buddhist scriptures have been seen as indicating the importance of free thinking and empirical inquiry to Buddhism. Perhaps the most popular Buddhist discourse used in this way is the Kālāma Sutta (AN 3.65). In this discourse, the Buddha is speaking to a number of villagers that are unsure of which ideas to believe. The key passage which is widely quoted states:

Come, Kālāmas, do not go by oral tradition, by lineage of teaching, by hearsay, by a collection of scriptures, by logical reasoning, by inferential reasoning, by reasoned cogitation, by the acceptance of a view after pondering it, by the seeming competence of a speaker, or because you think: 'The ascetic is our guru.' But when, Kālāmas, you know for yourselves: 'These things are unwholesome; these things are blameworthy; these things are censured by the wise; these things, if accepted and undertaken, lead to harm and suffering,' then you should abandon them.

The exact meaning of this passage has been widely debated and interpreted. Buddhist modernists consider this passage to show that the Buddha promoted a skeptical empirical investigation which rejected faith, dogma, scripture, Revelations and even rationalistic metaphysical speculations. Buddhist philosophers like K.N. Jayatilleke argue that this and other passages from the Buddhist scriptures indicate that early Buddhism promotes an "honest, impartial search for truth" as well as "critical investigation and personal verification" which is compatible with a scientific outlook. However, Bhikkhu Bodhi notes that this sutra does not rule out faith as an important component of the path. Another discourse, the Vīmaṃsaka Sutta (MN 47, with a Chinese parallel at MA 186) has been called "a remarkable advocacy of free inquiry" by Bhikkhu Analayo.

=== Reason and logic in Buddhist scholasticism ===
Buddhist texts contain exhortations to examine the teachings of the Buddha through reason and experience. Śāntarakṣita's (725–788 CE) Tattvasaṃgraha cites a well known scriptural passage that is also cited by the 14th Dalai Lama and other Buddhists:

"O monks, like gold that is heated, cut, and rubbed, my words should be analyzed by the wise and then accepted; they should not do so out of reverence." – A Sutra on Pure Realms Spread Out in a Dense Array

Buddhism also has a long tradition of epistemology and logic. Buddhist philosophers in this tradition, such as Dignāga and Dharmakīrti, developed complex theories of knowledge which held that there were only two "instruments of knowledge" or "epistemic tools" (pramana): perception and inference.

According to Cristian Coseru, Dignāga's theory of knowledge is strongly grounded on perception. Furthermore, unlike other Indian theories of knowledge, Indian Buddhist philosophers like Dharmakīrti (fl. c. 6th or 7th century) generally rejected scripture as a major epistemic instrument. Dharmakīrti held that one should not rely on scripture to decide issues that can be discovered through rational means and that one could reject unreasonable parts of scripture. However, he did argue that when it came to "radically inaccessible things" (such as karma), one could turn to scripture (which was an uncertain and fallible source).

=== Natural philosophy and proto-scientific practices ===
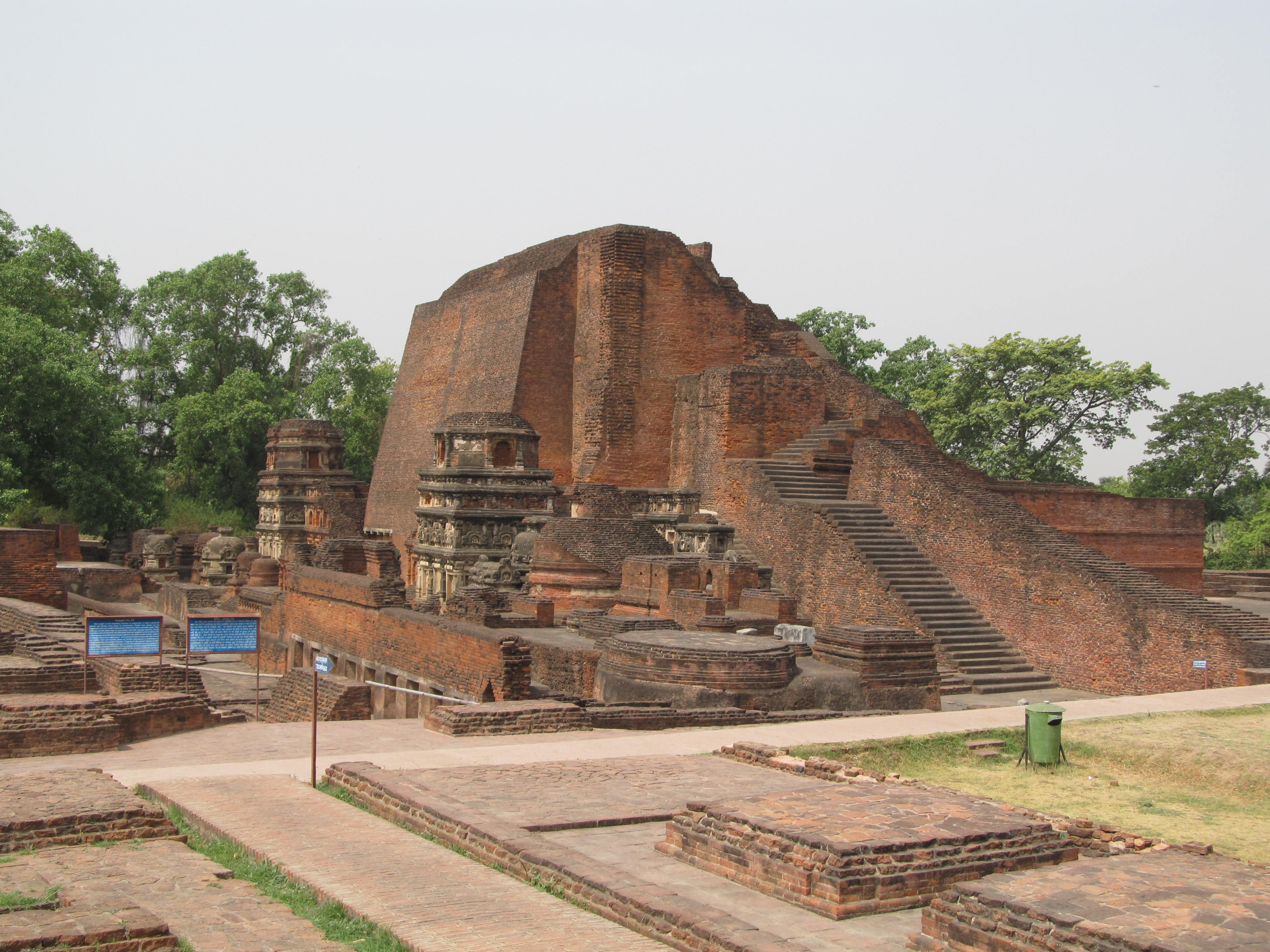
Ruins of Nālandā University

The early Buddhist texts contain various ideas about the nature of the world and the universe. However, they also warn against certain speculative questions regarding about the universe. In various early discourses, the Buddha rejects certain questions about the world as "unfathomable" or "unexplainable" (Skt. avyākṛta). These include questions about the eternity and the infinity of the universe. In the Cūḷamālukya Sutta, the Buddha uses the parable of a poisoned arrow to explain his approach to these questions, his teaching is focused on how to remove the arrow of suffering, not on the particular details about the arrow and who shot the arrow (and so forth). As Paul David Numrich writes, there are thus certain questions about the world that the Buddha sees as "irrelevant to the ultimate religious goal of liberation from the human condition."

In spite of this warning found in the Buddhist texts, Indian Buddhists developed complex theories about the physical world, including atomic theories, theories of sense perception, theories of time and space and Buddhist cosmology. Apart from teaching Buddhist philosophy, medieval Buddhist universities such as Nālandā (in modern day Bihar) were important centers for the study of natural philosophy and applied sciences such as cosmology, medicine and astronomy. Ancient Buddhist philosophy explored key questions about the natural world such as the nature of space and time, the nature and existence of atoms (and their indivisibility), the origin of the world and the relationship between mind and matter. It explored these questions through philosophical analysis and Thought experiments.

Medicine was a particularly important concern for ancient Buddhists, and references to it can be in all historical layers of Buddhist literature. Nālandā University was also said to have been the site of the composition of the Aṣṭāṅgahṛdaya-saṃhitā, an influential medical work by the physician Vāgbhaṭa. According to Pierce Salguero "Buddhist texts mentioning various aspects of medicine proliferated across the Buddhist world throughout the first millennium." Because of this, Buddhism was "one of the most important vehicles for the cross-cultural diffusion of Indian Medicine in pre-modern Asia." Closely related with this ancient medicine was the practice of Indian alchemy or rasaśāstra. Practitioners of rasaśāstra experimented with various substances and metals. Rasāyana is also an important part of some of the Buddhist tantras.

The Buddhist tradition of worldly sciences continued to develop in outside of India and today survives as part of Tibetan Medicine and Tibetan astrology (which includes astronomical and astrological elements). Traditional Buddhist cosmology taught that there were multiple world systems and that the universe goes through cycles of formation, endurance and destruction. It also holds that the universe has no absolute beginning (and thus rejects creationism and theism, but also the idea that the universe arose without a cause).

== Buddhism as scientific or as compatible with science ==
=== History of the Buddhist modernist discourse ===
==== 19th century modernism ====
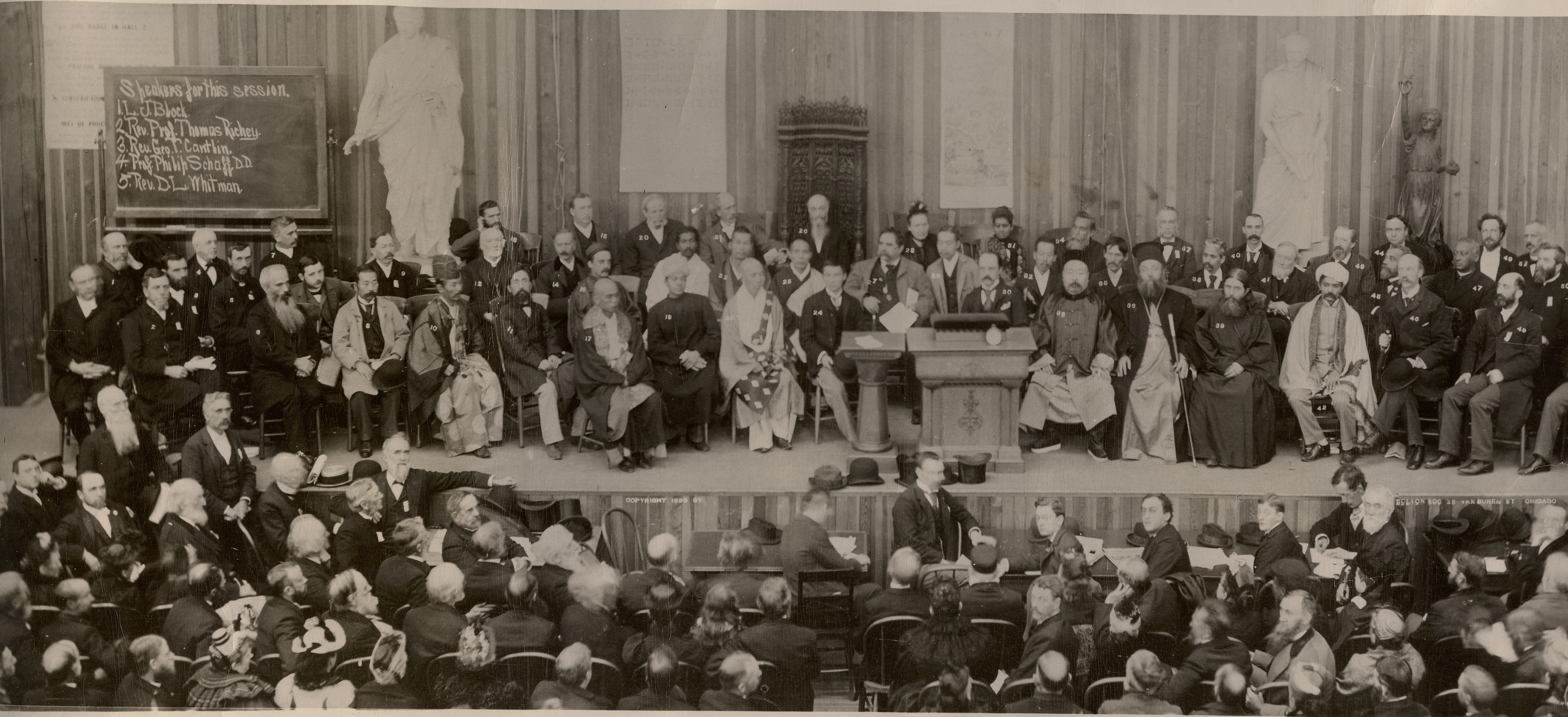
Parliament of the World's Religions, Chicago, United States, 1893.

A commonly held modern view is that Buddhism is exceptionally compatible with science and reason, or even that it is a kind of science (perhaps a "science of the mind" or a "scientific religion"). This view arose in the modern era, as part of what has been called "Buddhist modernism," and was defended by figures such as Migettuwatte Gunananda, Anagarika Dharmapala, Paul Carus, Shaku Sōen, D.T. Suzuki, Henry Olcott, and Edwin Arnold. These modernists accepted and promoted modern scientific theories such as evolution and held that they were consistent with the Buddhist understanding of Dharma (sometimes interpreted as a "natural law").

They also held that Buddhism was a rationalist religion that did not require faith in revelation, a God, superstition and religious ritual but was based on an understanding of causality and empiricism. (Note: Anagarika Dharmapala said in a lecture delivered at the Town Hall in New York in 1925: "The Message of the Buddha that I have to bring to you is free from theol-ogy, priestcraft, rituals, ceremonies, dogmas, heavens, hells and other the-ological shibboleths. The Buddha taught to the civilized Aryans of India 25 centuries ago a scientific religion containing the highest individualistic altruistic ethics, a philosophy of life built on psychological mysticism and a cosmogony which is in harmony with geology, astronomy, radioactivity and relativity. No creator god can create an ever-changing, ever-existing cosmos. Countless billions of aeons ago the earth was existing but under-going change, and there are billions of solar systems that had existed and exist and shall exist.") According to Geoffrey Samuel, some of these modernists even "suggested that Buddhism was barely a religion at all in the Western sense, but a scientifically-based philosophy in its own right." Some of these figures also dismissed the "irrational" elements of Buddhism as folk superstition. According to Martin J. Verhoeven, Buddhist modernists downplay mythic and religious elements such as traditional Indic cosmology, belief in Miracles and rituals in favor of the rational and psychological aspects of Buddhism.

Paul Carus for example, wrote that Buddha was "the first positivist, the first humanitarian, the first radical freethinker," while D.T. Suzuki held that the Buddhist view of karma can be seen as "an application in our ethical realm of the theory of the conservation of energy". Similarly, both Anagarika Dharmapala's and Shaku Sōen's presentations at the World's Parliament of Religions in 1893 presented Buddhism as being founded on the law of cause and effect (associating scientific ideas of causality with the Buddhist doctrine of dependent origination). Carus and other Buddhist modernists saw Buddhism as having certain advantages over Christianity. They held that Buddhism accepted the scientific ideal of a universe ordered by natural laws and did not require belief in a God or any being that could alter natural laws. For many Asian Buddhists, the narrative of Buddhism as rational and scientific was a useful strategy used to counter Christian and colonial attacks on Buddhism as backward. Others like Shaku Sōen, sought to create a more rational westernized Buddhism, or as he put it, to "wed the Great Vehicle [Mahayana Buddhism] to Western thought."

The idea that the Buddhist worldview was rational and scientific is also seen in the popular Buddhist Catechism, written by Henry Olcott. This book contained a chapter on Buddhism and science that rejected miracles as an explanation for the Buddha's supposedly supernatural feats and instead offered natural explanations for them (such as hypnotism and theosophical occult science). This modernist view was also promoted by early Buddhist societies in the West, such as Karl Seidenstücker and George Grimm's Society for the Buddhist Mission in Leipzig and the British Buddhist Society. George Grimm's (1868–1945) The teaching of the Buddha, the Religion of Reason (Die Lehre des Buddho, die Religion der Vernunft) is an important exposition of this rationalistic Buddhism. According to McMahan, western commentators on this topic were responding to "the Victorian crisis of faith and the emergence of the immense symbolic capital of scientific discourse." José Ignacio Cabezón notes that there were different opinions among American Buddhist modernists during the late 19th century. Some were happy to note the similarities between science and Buddhism and believed Buddhism was more compatible with science than Christianity (which was more likely to die out due to scientific findings). Other Buddhist modernists like Carus saw Buddhism as the "Religion of Science," which would make scientific truth "the last guide of a religious conception of mankind."

==== 20th and 21st centuries ====
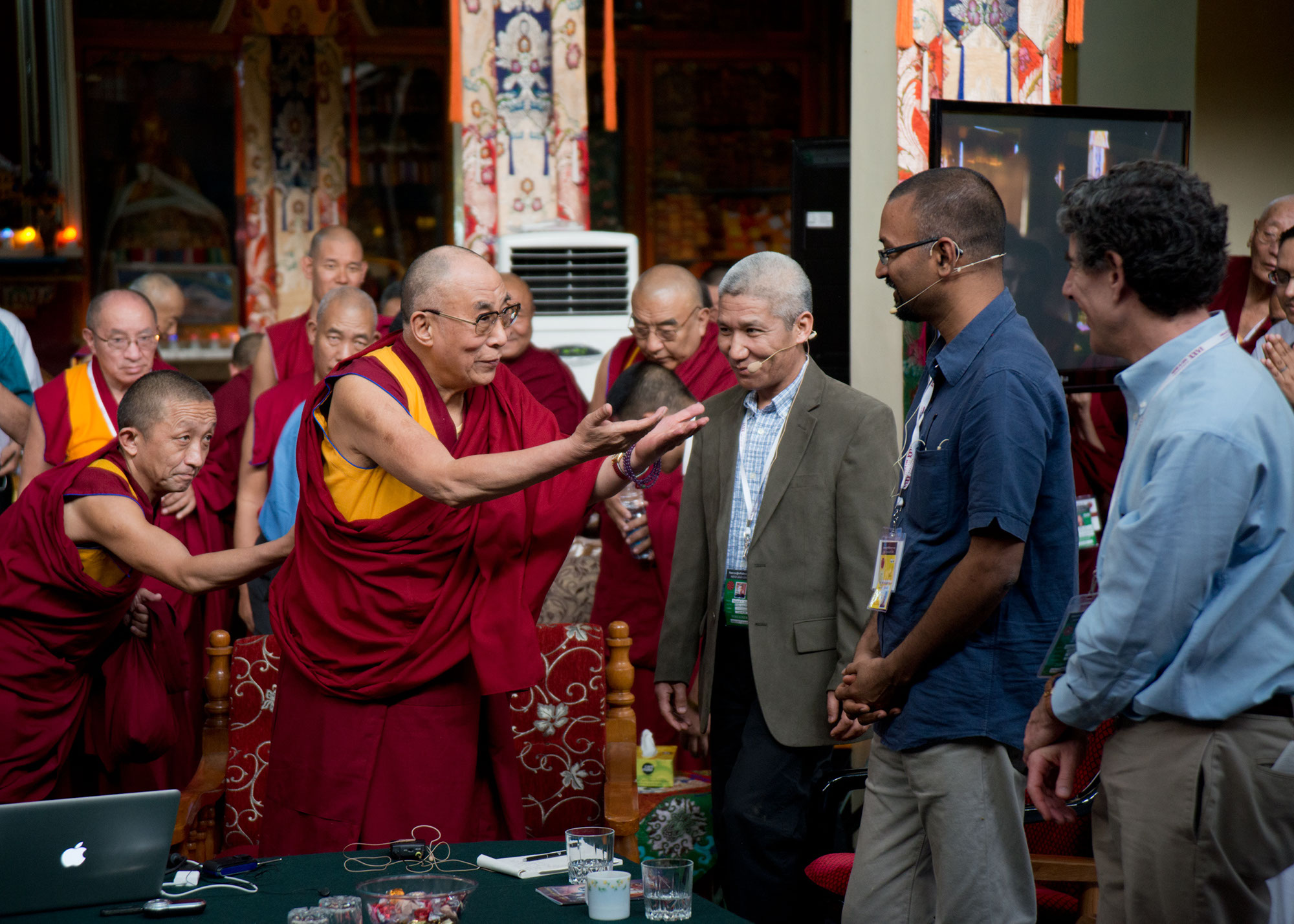
Rajesh Kasturirangan with the 14th Dalai Lama, Geshe Thupten Jinpa and Richard Davidson at Mind and Life Institute XXVI conference, 2013

As noted by David McMahan, the modernist idea of Buddhism as being compatible with science continued into the 20th century and remains strong today, having become "not only more voluminous but far more sophisticated throughout the late twentieth century and is now at its productive and creative zenith." The Buddhist modernist view has also been expounded by a variety of western intellectuals, including Nobel Prize–winning philosopher Bertrand Russell, who described Buddhism as "a speculative and scientific philosophy." (Note: Russell states that "Buddhism is a combination of both speculative and scientific philosophy. It advocates the scientific method and pursues that to a finality that may be called Rationalistic. In it are to be found answers to such questions of interest as: 'What is mind and matter? Of them, which is of greater importance? Is the universe moving towards a goal? What is man's position? Is there living that is noble?' It takes up where science cannot lead because of the limitations of the latter's instruments. Its conquests are those of the mind.")

In the late 20th century and the early 21st, numerous publications discussing Buddhist ideas and science were released (such as James H. Austin's Zen and the Brain and works by Francisco Varela and Daniel Goleman). Furthermore, according to McMahan "the compatibility of Buddhism and modern science has not only become a staple of popular Buddhist literature, it has also become a hypothesis in a large number of quite sophisticated experimental studies." The Mind and Life Institute is at the forefront of such studies. The Institute hosts conferences on Buddhism and science and sponsors research on Buddhist meditation. McMahan also argues that "perhaps no major tradition has attempted to adopt scientific discourse more vigorously than Buddhism." Geoffrey Samuel remarks that these dialogues point to the fact that westerners (including scientists) have come to take Buddhist ideas much more seriously as a valuable system of knowledge. The Mind and Life Institute has also influenced how Tibetan Buddhism is presented to western audiences, and it is also closely connected to the 14th Dalai Lama's promotion of scientific education among Tibetan Buddhist monks.

José Ignacio Cabezón argues that modern Buddhists have at times discussed the relationship between Buddhism and science in three main ways: conflict/ambivalence, identity/similarity, and complementarity. Cabezón outlines various kinds of views regarding complementarity. One of these ideas is that there is a "similarity in method, and difference in the object of study". This sees Buddhism as mainly a science of the subjective world, while science is mainly concerned with the external and material world. In this view, both disciplines can learn from each other regarding these fields. Another view "stresses difference in method and similarity in content." This view sees Buddhism as using "nonconceptual modes of intuitive understanding that emerge as the result of the practice of meditation" which is different from the objective and conceptual scientific method and leads to self transformation.

The discourse of complementarity often seeks to unify these different disciplines, which focus on different aspects (the exterior and interior worlds, the quantitative and the qualitative, reason and intuition, etc.). This discourse generally argues that there should be a balance and harmony between these elements. Cabezon singles out Fritjof Capra's The Tao of Physics as one of the most influential examples of the discourse of complementarity. According to Capra, none other than the great physicist Werner Heisenberg said that he was in "complete agreement" with the main idea of the book, mainly that the "two basic themes" found in modern physics ("the fundamental interrelatedness and interdependence of all phenomena and the intrinsically dynamic nature of reality") are also found in eastern thought.

The discourse of complementary can also be found in the work of Daniel Goleman, who writes regarding Buddhism and psychotherapy that "when you put the two psychologies together, you get a more complete spectrum of human development." Another publication which argues for the complementarity of science and Buddhist thought is The Embodied Mind (1991, Varela, Thompson & Rosch). This book argues that Buddhism can provide a sophisticated phenomenology of embodied experience.

=== Views of Theravada Buddhists ===
Since the Buddhist modernist revival in Southeast Asia, Theravada Buddhist intellectuals (such as Anagarika Dharmapala) have generally embraced science and have seen Buddhism as compatible with its findings.

For example, K.N. Jayatilleke (1920–1970), a Sinhalese Buddhist philosopher, writes that the Pali Canon, "emphasizes the importance of the scientific outlook in dealing with the problems of morality and religion. Its specific 'dogmas' are said to be capable of verification. And its general account of the nature of man and the universe is one that accords with the findings of science rather than being at variance with them." Jayatilleke points to the early Buddhist idea that there are many worlds, suns and "world systems" (lokadhatu) as an example. He also argues that the Buddhist idea that humans and nature are constantly changing according to causal laws is easily compatible with biological evolution and therefore, modern findings do not threaten the Buddhist worldview. Furthermore, Jayatilleke points out that Buddhism holds that the law of cause and effect applies even when it comes to moral and religious phenomena. Because of this, Jayatilleke writes that "Buddhism is not likely to be at variance with science so long as scientists confine themselves to their methodology and their respective fields without making a dogma of materialism."

In a similar fashion, Buddhadasa P. Kirthisinghe, a Theravada Buddhist and a microbiologist, argues that Buddhism and science are compatible because Buddhism is based on a similar method of empirical inquiry, observation and careful analysis which is "in conformity with and in the spirit of science." Bhikkhu Ñanajivako, citing Bertrand Russell's An Outline of Philosophy, writes that modern science's rejection of substance theory in favor of processes or events is commensurate with the Buddhist impermanence (anicca) doctrine, which sees the world made up of transient dhammas.

=== Views of East Asians ===
Erik J. Hammerstrom has written a study of the reception of modern science in 19th and 20th century Chinese Buddhism. According to Hammerstrom, during the 1920s and 30s, "dozens of articles and monographs devoted to the topic of science and Buddhism appeared in the rapidly growing Buddhist press of China." Chinese Buddhists like Taixu, Yang Wenhui, Wang Hui and Wang Xiaoxu (an electrical engineer and lay Buddhist) were some of the leading figures in this discourse. According to Hammerstrom, 20th century Chinese Buddhists championed the scientific method and its findings such as heliocentrism and evolution and generally did not question the findings of science. However, Chinese Buddhists also rejected certain ideas associated with science at the time, such as scientism, materialism and Social Darwinism (and they participated in public debates about such ideas). They also sought to carve out a space for Buddhism as a "philosophy of life" (人生觀, renshengguan) which they saw as a separate field of inquiry.

Not all Buddhist modernists thought that Buddhism could stand on a rationalist scientific framework alone. D.T. Suzuki initially accepted the idea that Buddhism could be founded on scientific principles, writing that karma "may be regarded as an application in our ethical realm of the theory of the conservation of energy (Outlines of Mahayana Buddhism, 1907). However, Suzuki later changed his mind about this, writing in 1959 that "a religion based solely on science is not enough."

Similarly, the Chinese Buddhist modernist Taixu (1890–1947) held that while scientific study might help prove Buddhist doctrines, "it cannot ascertain the realities" of Buddhism and therefore it "does not go far enough into the mysteries of nature, and that if she went further the Buddhist doctrine would be even more evident." Thus, while for Taixu, "the Buddhist scholar is aided in his research" by the use of scientific methods, they must ultimately go beyond such methods to understand the true nature of reality. Taixu wrote that "the reality of the Buddhist doctrine is only to be grasped by those who are in the sphere of supreme and universal perception, in which they can behold the true nature of the Universe, but for this they must have attained the wisdom of Buddha himself, and it is not by the use of science or logic that we can expect to acquire such wisdom. Science therefore is only a stepping stone in such matters"

Trịnh Xuân Thuận, a Vietnamese-American astrophysicist, has also written about Buddhism and science, which he sees as "two complementary modes of knowledge." Thuận disagrees with Stephen Jay Gould, who held the view that science and religion examine two "non-overlapping magisteria." Instead, Thuận thinks they do overlap (since Buddhism is a kind of contemplative science) and as such, there can be "a fruitful and illuminating dialogue" between them.

=== Views of Tibetan Buddhists ===
Similar views of the complementarity of science and Buddhism remain popular in modern Tibetan Buddhism. Gendun Chopel was the first Tibetan Buddhist to write about science and he urged his countrymen to accept the methods of science, which were based on empirical observation and was therefore seen by him as compatible with the epistemic methods of Buddhism (i.e. the pramana of direct perception or pratyakṣa). Chopel writes that science even confirms central Buddhist doctrines such as impermanence and dependent origination, though it can also disprove certain Buddhist views, such as the insentience of plants (and therefore, Buddhists should not stubbornly cling to their doctrine). Chopel argued that Buddhism can only survive as an ally of science and prayed that science and the teachings of the Buddha "may abide together for tens of thousands of years."

More recently, contemporary Tibetan Buddhists like the 14th Dalai Lama, B. Alan Wallace, and Robert Thurman have also argued for the compatibility of Buddhism and science. According to Lopez, "the Fourteenth Dalai Lama of Tibet has been the most visible and influential Buddhist teacher to embrace the discourse of Buddhism and Science." The Dalai Lama is known for his interest in science and has written a book on the relationship between science and Buddhism, The Universe in a Single Atom (2005), where he discusses various topics, including physics and evolution. The Dalai Lama argues that science and Buddhism share the same commitment "to keep searching for reality by empirical means and to be willing to discard accepted or long-held positions if our search finds that the truth is different."

B. Alan Wallace (who has studied physics and Buddhism formally in Western institutions) sees Buddhism as an "organized, systematic enterprise aimed at understanding reality, and it presents a wide range of testable laws and principles," as well as a "time-tested discipline of rational and empirical inquiry." Wallace argues that Buddhism is a mainly pragmatic enterprise aimed at "the pursuit of eudaimonic well-being", and as such, it focuses on the subjective and on qualitative states of consciousness (unlike science, which focuses on the quantifiable and the objective), discussing issues such as mental training and ethics. Wallace also argues that Buddhist insights are roughly empirical, since they are based on direct experiences (of a subjective, first-person character) which are also replicable.

However, the Dalai Lama, Thurman and Wallace all note that Buddhism rejects a materialistic (or physicalist) interpretation of science which sees consciousness as something that arises from physical causes alone. For Wallace, scientific materialism is a metaphysical assumption, a dogma which goes beyond the domain of empirical science and "presents formidable obstacles to any meaningful collaboration between Buddhism and science." Similarly, Robert Thurman criticizes the physicalist interpretation of neuroscience and sees Buddhist meditation as a kind of "inner science" with "a vast array of mental technologies". Thurman also thinks that the materialist worldview has led to an imbalance in the world where "our powers to effect the outer reality have outstripped our powers over ourselves," and sees Buddhist practice as a corrective to this.

The 14th Dalai Lama has explicitly rejected any kind of scientism which would argue that only science can discover truths about the world (and that those truths ultimately reduce to the physical world alone) and thus that anything which is not proven by science is false or insignificant. However, he also argues that "spirituality must be tempered by the insights and discoveries of science. If as spiritual practitioners we ignore the discoveries of science, our practice is also impoverished, as this mind-set can lead to fundamentalism." For the 14th Dalai Lama, science is concerned with conventional truth and understanding the nature of the mundane world, while Buddhism offers "a real under-standing of the true nature of the mind," and the ultimate truth of liberation. Lopez compares this view with the view of Gould's "non-overlapping magisteria."

=== Views of scholars of Buddhism ===
According to one scholar of Buddhism, John Dunne, "Buddhism endorses the notion that if we want to prove something, we need to use empirical evidence." Dunne argues that this principle trumps what the Buddhist scriptures say, since the Buddhist tradition considers direct experience (Sanskrit: pratyakṣa) as a higher source of knowledge than scripture (which is secondary). However, Dunne also notes that Buddhist theories do not undergo constant revision throughout the centuries (as a result of new observations) as they have done in science, though he notes that more recently the 14th Dalai Lama has been interested in learning from science in this regard.

David McMahan has written about the modernist scientific Buddhism discourse. According to McMahan, this discourse should not be dismissed entirely, since modern Buddhist traditions have gone through "a concrete and highly significant transformation", which includes adapting to the scientific worldview and creating new forms of Buddhism. McMahan writes that this:

is not just a western orientalist representation of the eastern Other, nor is it just a native strategy of legitimation for Asian Buddhists, though it does involve both. It is rather a part of the ongoing hybridization of certain forms of Buddhism with distinctively modern cultural formations and intellectual practices. The historical question regarding contemporary Buddhism, then, is not "Is Buddhism scientific?" but "How is Buddhism transforming itself through its engagement with science?" Rather than telling us "what Buddhism is," this discourse is itself constitutive of novel forms of Buddhism with shifting epistemic structures and criteria for authority and legitimacy.

However, McMahan also thinks that there is also the danger of Buddhism losing "a great deal of its diversity" if the adaptation process is taken too far and that "too much adaptation and accommodation may in fact blur the distinctions between the epistemic claims of Buddhism and those of current Western traditions." This could lead to the loss of Buddhist distinctiveness and to the making of Buddhism into an impotent tradition that has nothing to offer to modernity.

According to Geoffrey Samuel, while the dialogue between Buddhism and science has generally focused on ways in which Buddhism can adapt to science or how science can study the efficacy of Buddhist practices, "the more significant developments are arguably elsewhere, in the potential of Buddhist thought to provoke genuine rethinking and transformation within science itself." Similarly, Martin J. Verhoeven thinks that "we might better advance the discussion not by highlighting where Buddhism and science see eye-to-eye, but precisely where they do not, perhaps forcing each to confront its own contradictions and shortcomings." Verhoeven argues that Buddhism and science see reality in different ways. The central focus of Buddhism is on one's conscious experience and its conditioned nature. This includes the external world, which seems separate, but is actually "inescapably conditioned by and of a piece with oneself" and "depends on our position, our interpretations, our intentions, and our desires."

José Ignacio Cabezón writes that there has been an increasing sophistication in the dialogue between science and Buddhism, which he sees as due to the advances in both science and Buddhist studies as well as due to the "increased accessibility of information about these two traditions." Regarding the discourse on complementarity, Cabezón thinks that it may be useful if understood "as a fluid metaphor". However, if understood as a literal and strict binary opposition, it could lead to a stunted dialogue, since both traditions discuss numerous elements that are of interest to the other (for example, Buddhism often discusses physical events and science has much to say about the mind). As such, the "segregationist metaphors" which are often used in the complementarity discourse are ultimately artificial "because scientific claims impinge, and sometimes impinge negatively, upon Buddhist ones, and vice versa." Because of this, Cabezón argues that Buddhism and science are "complete systems that resist dichotomizing: systems that can both support and challenge each other at a variety of different levels."

Professor P. L. Dhar claims that the practice of Buddhism, Dharma, is compatible with the practice of scientific discoveries, as both reflects human tendency to inquire into things. On one hand, in scientific practices we ask questions about the external physical world, and gain knowledge about the facts of the world. On the other hand, in practicing Dharma we inquire about the essence of our own beings, and gain wisdom about our existence.

Gary Zukav points out a new perspective of understanding the significance of science. He writes:

[The laws of Science] are the reflection in physical reality...of a larger non-physical dynamic at work in non-physical domains. When Science and its discoveries are understood with the higher order of logic and understanding of the multisensory human, they reveal the same richness that Life itself displays everywhere and endlessly.

According to Zukav, the significance of science lies in its reflection of the relationship between our own being and the external world. This point can be illustrated with specific branches of science. For example, Newtonian physics - a classical notion of physical world characterised by axiomatic equations and general laws of motion, reflects our desire and assertiveness not only to discover physical facts about the world by scientific induction, but also to make use of our discoveries in a constructive way. There are many ways to further clarify this example, and here is one such way. As a founding figure of modern science, Francis Bacon contributed towards the enlightenment movement by popularizing the term ''knowledge is power'', which implicitly sanctions not only the manipulation, but also potentially the exploitation, of the natural world. This shows the potential that conventional modern science can be overpowering and lack balance; meanwhile, the practice of Buddhism can act as a counter-balance to science: ''Science without Dharma is blind and Dharma without Science is lame. ''

==== Criticism of the Buddhist modernist discourse ====
Several contemporary scholars of Buddhism have argued against the idea that Buddhism is a science or "scientific". According to Donald S. Lopez Jr., the traditional Buddhist worldview understands the Buddha's ancient understanding of reality as complete, and thus "nothing beyond that reality has been discovered since." Lopez argues that attempts to make Buddhism compatible with science severely restrict Buddhism, "eliminating much of what has been deemed essential, whatever that might be, to the exalted monks and ordinary lay-people who have gone for refuge to the Buddha over the course of more than two thousand years." Lopez argues that in traditional Buddhism, the truth is something that the Buddha has already discovered, making Buddhism a deeply conservative tradition which is wary of innovation and deviation. This is different from the scientific worldview, in which the complete truth of the universe has not been fully discovered yet.

Lopez has also described the historical development which led to the idea that Buddhism was compatible with science, which began in the Victorian era, with the European study of Buddhist literature in Indian languages (Sanskrit and Pali). Western scholars often saw the historical Buddha as a rational humanist, critical of Brahmanical superstition. This idea was then taken up by Asians and theosophists and widely promoted as a counter to missionary Christianity. Lopez thinks that the "scientific" Buddhism discourse is outdated, especially since the colonial and missionary threats to Buddhism in Asia have subsided. Lopez argues it is best to see Buddhism as radically incompatible with science, as seeking to transcend all biological life, to go totally beyond the world and thus as being at odds with the world and with science. However, Lopez also notes that disputes between Buddhists and scientists over the bare facts of science "have occurred only rarely in the history of Buddhism and science."

Evan Thompson has also criticized the narrative of Buddhism as being uniquely scientific in his Why I am Not a Buddhist (2020).

== Buddhism and specific scientific fields ==
=== Biology ===
Modern Buddhists have generally accepted and embraced modern theories of biology, such as evolution, as being compatible with Buddhist thought. According to a 2009 survey by the Pew Research Center, eighty one percent of Buddhists accept the theory of evolution as the "best explanation for the origins of human life on earth" (the highest among all religions surveyed).

Robin Cooper's The Evolving Mind (1996) is one publication which discusses Buddhism and the field of biology. Cooper argues that Buddhism is compatible with evolutionary thought, but he also argues that the Buddhist view also sees a role for the mind in the evolution of living beings. Cooper writes that mind-led adaptations also play a role in evolution, along with random genetic mutation. He attempts to harmonize biological theories of evolution with Buddhist views of the transformation of the mind.

William S. Waldron cites the Agañña sutta as a text which affirms that sentient beings, including humans, change over time. However this discourse describes a process in which heavenly beings (devas) devolve into a lower form of life on earth as a result of mental afflictions or kleshas (such as greed and desire) and the actions fueled by these afflictions. As such, Buddhism sees our physical existence as being caused by past actions (done in our previous lives). Waldron thinks that this view is roughly compatible (but clearly not the same as) the theory of evolution, which holds that our current physical form is based on the past actions of our ancestors. According to Waldron, "the Buddhists and biologists thus largely concur that the very forms and structures of human life result from the accumulative actions of innumerable beings over countless generations."

David P. Barash (who describes himself as a Buddhist atheist) has written a book about Buddhism and biology, which according to him, "complement each other like a pair of powerful searchlights illuminating the same thing from different angles". Barash argues that modern biology is commensurate with the Buddhist view of impermanence and not-self, since both see sentient beings (individuals or groups) as a product of constantly changing and interrelated processes, and thus sees them as being without a fixed and separate identity.

==== Key differences ====
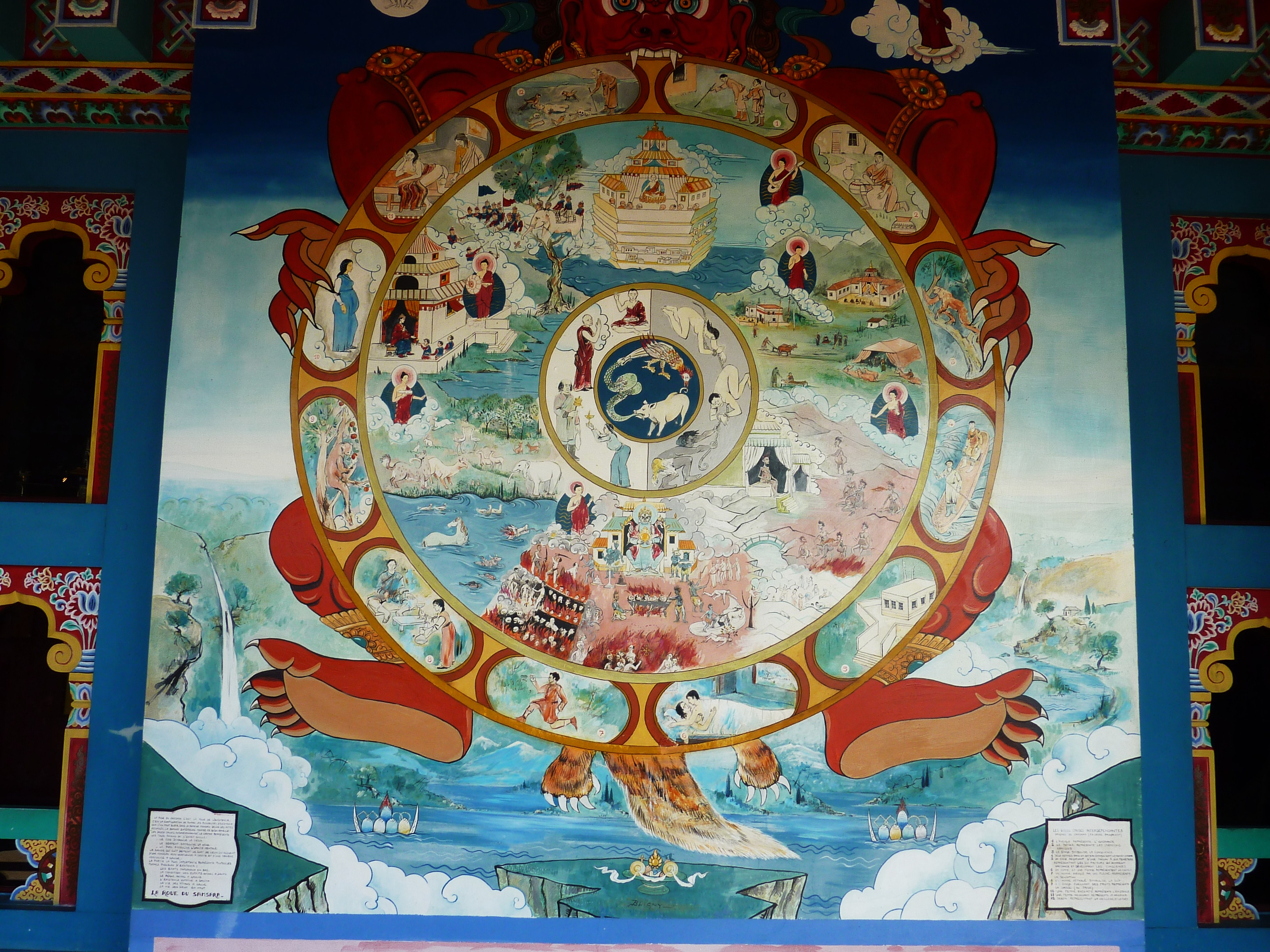
The classical Buddhist understanding of life includes karma and rebirth (depicted here in a Tibetan "wheel of existence").

Donald Lopez argues that the naturalistic theory of evolution is at odds with the traditional Buddhist view of karma. This is because the basic Buddhist understanding of how sentient beings undergo change is based on the rebirth of their consciousness, which could be into any form of existence (animal, human, god realms etc.), while the Darwinian view is strictly based on genetic mutation and natural selection which are physical phenomena. According to Lopez, the main reason these views are at odds is that Buddhism reserves a central place for consciousness and volition in the production of all sentient life, while this is not the case with modern biology.

In The Universe in a Single Atom (2005), the 14th Dalai Lama similarly points outs that while biological theories generally attempts to explain things solely from the perspective of physical causes (and are often reductive), Buddhist thought focuses on the role of consciousness. As such, the Dalai Lama finds theories which focus only on physical causes "deeply unsatisfying", since it seems difficult to explain how conscious beings can arise from an unconscious basis (i.e. emergentism). He also points out that this difference might be due to the different methods and goals of Buddhism and science. Therefore, while the Dalai Lama thinks that evolution "gives us a fairly coherent account of the evolution of human life on earth," he also holds that karma and consciousness have central roles in nature and therefore biology cannot explain all aspects of life (such as consciousness, religious experience or morality).

=== Physics ===
According to Matthieu Ricard, Buddhist thought asks some of the same questions that physicists ask about reality, time, matter and space, and uses rational analysis and thought experiments (which are also used by physicists). However, unlike physics which focuses on measuring the physical world to better understand it, the Buddhist tradition focuses on inner contemplation and its goal is mainly therapeutic.

Some of the metaphysical doctrines of Buddhism have sometimes been compared favorably with the insights of modern physics. The 14th Dalai Lama writes in The Universe in a Single Atom (2005) that "there is an unmistakable resonance between the notion of emptiness and the new physics. If on the quantum level, matter is revealed as less solid and definable than it appears, then it seems to me that science is coming closer to the Buddhist contemplative insights of emptiness and interdependence [pratītyasamputpāda]."

The Dalai Lama cites his conversations with David Bohm and Anton Zeilinger, both physicists who supported the idea that the Buddhist view of emptiness (the lack of any independent and fixed essence) was consistent with the insights of modern quantum physics. The Dalai Lama has also been part of various dialogues with physicists such as Arthur Zajonc (who was also president of the Mind and Life Institute) and Anton Zeilinger. Some of these discussions on the nature of physics have been published.

==== Comparisons by physicists ====
Astrophysicist Trịnh Xuân Thuận argues that the Buddhist idea of "subtle impermanence", which refers to the idea that everything is constantly changing extremely rapidly is consistent with "our modern scientific conception of the universe" which holds that everything is in constant motion. He also compares the Buddhist doctrine of emptiness (the idea that nothing has an intrinsic nature) with the findings of quantum physics, which understands that sub-atomic particles cannot be understood as being real solid entities with fixed properties such as momentum and position (this is one understanding of the Heisenberg uncertainty principle). Thuận cites Erwin Schrödinger who said that "it is better not to view a particle as a permanent entity, but rather as an instantaneous event. Sometimes these events link together to create the illusion of permanent entities." Thuận sees this understanding of sub-atomic particles as similar to the understanding of reality in Buddhist metaphysics.

Thuận and Matthieu Ricard also discuss the similarities between Buddhist views of interdependence and phenomena such as quantum nonlocality and Mach's principle in The quantum and the lotus. According to Thuận, the views of Bohr and Heisenberg seem to support the Buddhist view that physical particles do not exist as independent phenomena, but can only be said to exist in dependence on our conceptual designations and the process of observation. This view of the quantum world is sometimes called the Copenhagen interpretation.

The Italian theoretical physicist Carlo Rovelli cites Nagarjuna in his book Helgoland, a defense of the relational interpretation of quantum mechanics, which understands quantum properties as arising from the relations between quantum phenomena. According to Rovelli, "properties of an object are the way in which it acts upon other objects; reality is this web of interactions." Rovelli thinks that the Madhyamaka philosophy of Nāgārjuna resonates with the relational view of Quantum Mechanics and provides a conceptual understanding of reality that does not need a metaphysical foundation. Rovelli writes that "Nāgārjuna has given us a formidable conceptual tool for thinking about the relationality of quanta: we can think of interdependence without autonomous essence entering the equation."

Oxford physicist Vlatko Vedral, in his Decoding Reality, mentions the Buddhist theory of emptiness as an ancient example of the philosophy of "relationalism." Vedral, who argues for an interpretation of quantum physics based on information theory, states that "Quantum physics is indeed very much in agreement with Buddhistic emptiness." He states that "we will never arrive at 'the thing in itself' by any kind of means. Everything that exists, exists by convention and labelling and is therefore dependent on other things." This is similar to some forms of Buddhist philosophy (such as Madhyamaka) which hold that everything is merely conceptual.

Physics professor Vic Mansfield has also written on the similarities between the modern understanding of time and special relativity and Madhyamaka thought. According to Mansfield, an appreciation of how these two traditions understand time as a relative phenomenon can aid a deeper understanding of both and that "a nontrivial synergy between these two very different disciplines is possible." Mansfield also argues that this kind of dialogue is important for Buddhism because "if Buddhism is to come to the West, in the best and fullest sense of the term, then interaction with science is both inevitable and necessary for a real transplant to take place."

=== Cosmology ===
In his discussion of cosmology, the 14th Dalai Lama notes that "Buddhism and science share a fundamental reluctance to postulate a transcendent being as the origin of all things." Furthermore, Buddhists like the Dalai Lama have no problem accepting the Big Bang theory (since ancient Buddhist views about the cosmos accept that there are periods of expansion). However, Trịnh Xuân Thuận and the Dalai Lama both argue that from the Buddhist point of view, there is no absolute beginning to the universe. This would be more compatible with certain cosmogonic theories of the universe, such as those that posit a Cyclic model of the universe or those that argue for a multiverse.

There are different Buddhist cosmologies. The cosmology of the Kalachakra system popular in Tibetan Buddhism holds that the material world arises out of the supportive element of space, which is made up of "space particles", the other four elements arise from this medium. The Dalai Lama believes this is compatible with the idea that the universe arose from a quantum vacuum state.

The Dalai Lama also notes that in Buddhist cosmology, there is a role for consciousness and karma, since Buddhist systems hold that the nature of a world system is connected with the karmic propensities of sentient beings. However, the Dalai Lama points out that this does not mean everything is due to karma, since many things merely arise due to the works of natural laws. As such, the Dalai Lama argues that "the entire process of the unfolding of a universe system is a matter of the natural law of causality" but that karma also influences its very beginning and that when a universe is able to support life "its fate becomes entangled with the karma of the beings who will inhabit it." Because Buddhist thought sees consciousness as being interconnected with the physical world, Buddhists like the Dalai Lama hold that "even the laws of physics are entangled with the karma of the sentient beings that will arise in that universe."

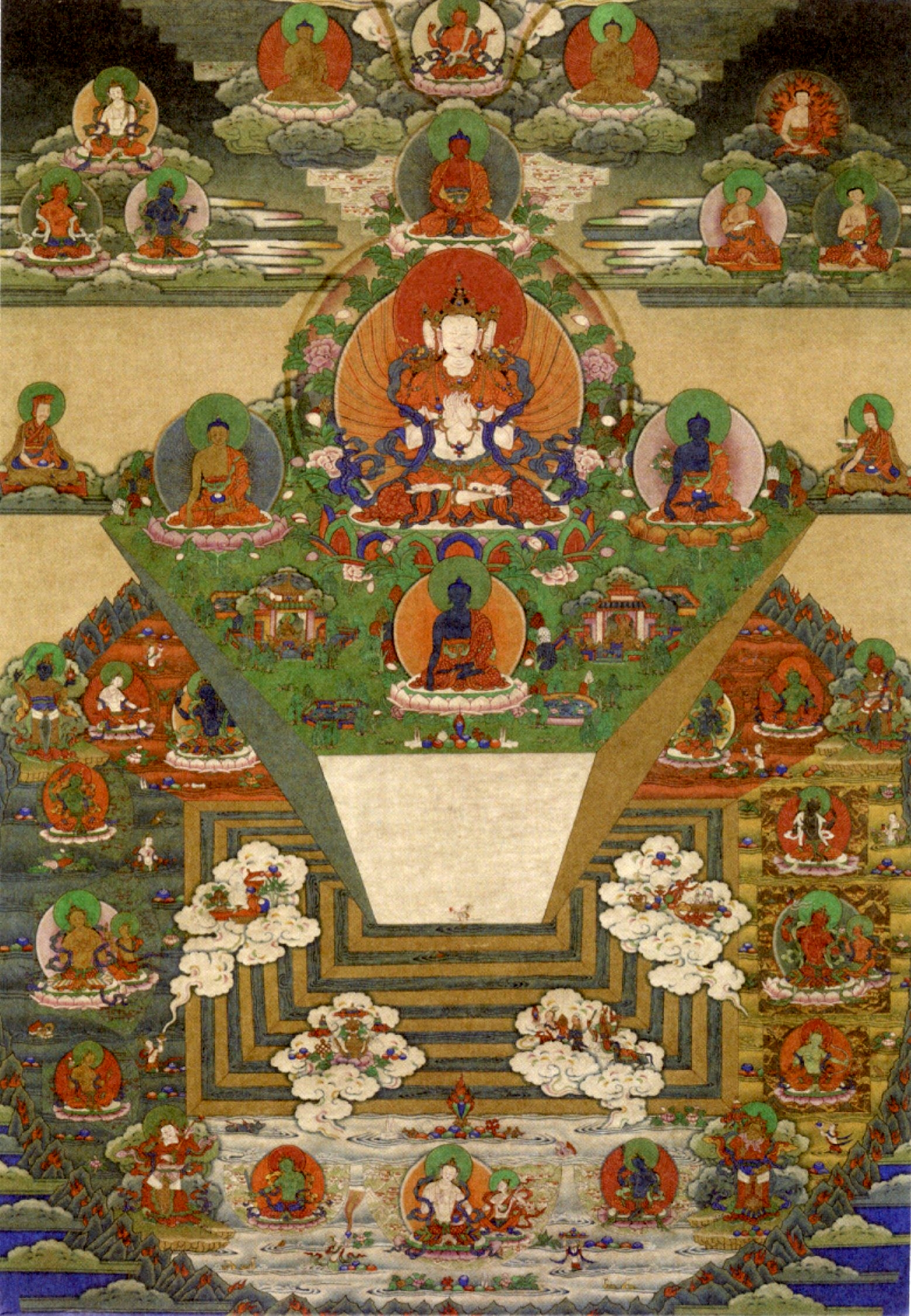
Bhutanese thangka depicting Mount Meru, 19th century, Trongsa Dzong, Trongsa, Bhutan.

==== Traditional cosmography ====
Certain traditional Buddhist ideas about the world are also incompatible with modern science, and have been abandoned by numerous modern Buddhists. Perhaps one of the most well known of these ideas is the view of the world found in various classic Buddhist texts which holds there is a giant mountain at the center of the world called Mount Meru (or Sumeru). According to Lopez, "the human realm that Buddhist texts describe is a flat earth, or perhaps more accurately a flat ocean, its waters contained by a ring of iron mountains. In that ocean is a great central mountain, surrounded in the four cardinal directions by island continents."

As Lopez notes, as early as the 18th century, Buddhist scholars like Tominaga Nakamoto (1715–1746) began to question this classical Buddhist cosmography, holding that they were adopted by the Buddha from Indian theories, but that they were incidental and thus not at the heart of Buddha's teaching. While some traditional Buddhists did defend the traditional cosmology, others like Shimaji Mokurai (1838–1911) argued that it was not foundational to Buddhism and was merely an element of Indian mythology. Others like Kimura Taiken (1881–1930), went further and argued that this traditional cosmography was not part of original Buddhism.

The issue of Mount Meru was also discussed by modern Buddhist intellectuals like Gendun Chopel and the 14th Dalai Lama. According to Choepel, the Meru cosmology is a provisional teaching taught in accord with the ideas of ancient India, but not appropriate for the modern era. Similarly, the 14th Dalai Lama writes that "my own view is that Buddhism must abandon many aspects of the Abhidharma cosmology". The Dalai Lama sees the falsehood of this traditional cosmology as not affecting the core of Buddhism (the teaching of the Four Noble Truths and liberation) since it is "secondary to the account of the nature and origins of sentient beings".

=== Psychology ===
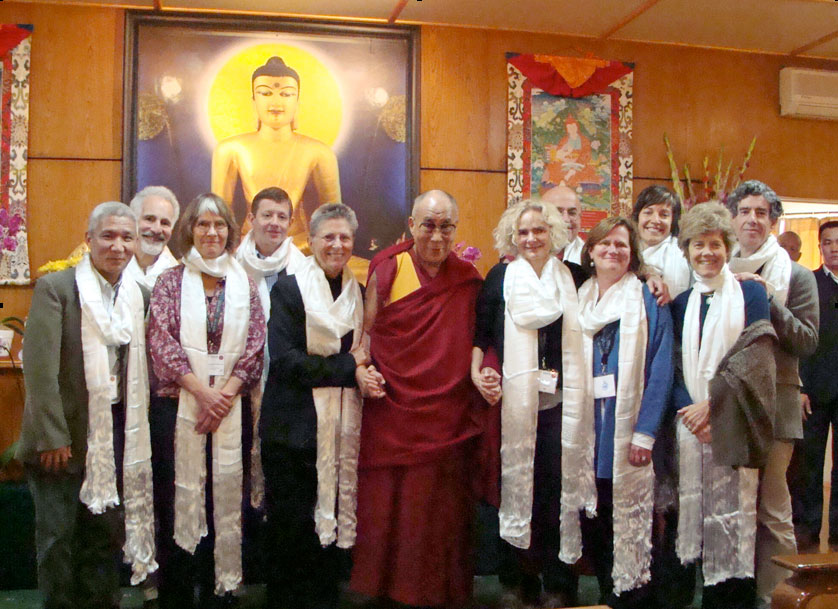
Nora Volkow with the Dalai Lama and others at a Mind and Life dialogue in Dharamsala (2013)

In the 20th century, Buddhism has been in close contact with the field of psychology and has often been interpreted as a kind of psychology in its own right. In America, William James often drew on Buddhist ideas (which he saw as the psychology of the future). Influenced by Buddhism, James promoted meditation and coined the term "stream of consciousness". Another 20th century defender of Buddhism was Gerald Du Pre, who saw Buddhism as a "scientific psychology".

Various modern therapists have written on the relationship between Buddhism and psychotherapy. These include Mark Epstein (Thoughts Without a Thinker 1995, Psychotherapy Without the Self, 2008), Jeffrey B. Rubin, Andrew Olendzki and Nina Coltart (1927–1997).

Various authors such as William S. Waldron and David Galin have also written about the Buddhist theory of not-self (anatman) and how it can provide insights to the development of a more dynamic, conditional and constructivist views of personality, personal identity and the self. Daniel Goleman has argued that the Buddhist view of the emptiness of the self "may turn out to fit the data far better than the notions that have dominated Psychological thinking for the last century."

Robert Wright has argued (in his 2017 Why Buddhism Is True) that the Buddhist analysis of human suffering and delusion is fundamentally correct and that this is backed up by evolutionary psychology, which helps explain how natural selection hardwired humans with powerful but distorted cognitions and emotions which are effective at getting us to survive and pass on our genes in a pre-historic environment. These cognitive modules do not depict reality as it is, and do not often lead to well being. Wright also thinks that the Buddhist view of not-self (anatta) is compatible with modern psychological understandings of the mind. He cites various modern studies and psychological theories (such as the modular view of the mind defended by Michael Gazzaniga) to back up the idea that there is no "CEO" in control of the mind. Wright argues that Buddhist mindfulness meditation can provide a way to gain personal insights into these delusions and may help weaken their hold on us.

The field of Transpersonal psychology has also been influenced by Buddhist ideas and various figures in this field see Buddhism and western psychology as complementary, since each provides a structure of human development that is not found in other (contemplative development and developmental psychology respectively). According to José Ignacio Cabezón, this idea "has been put forward most clearly and forcefully" in Transformations of Consciousness (Wilber, Engler, and Brown 1986), a collection of essays from the Journal of Transpersonal Psychology. However, Cabezón is unconvinced by the attempts of these figures to present a single and unified structure of meditative development (which they source from various traditions, including Buddhism).

=== Mindfulness and meditation research ===
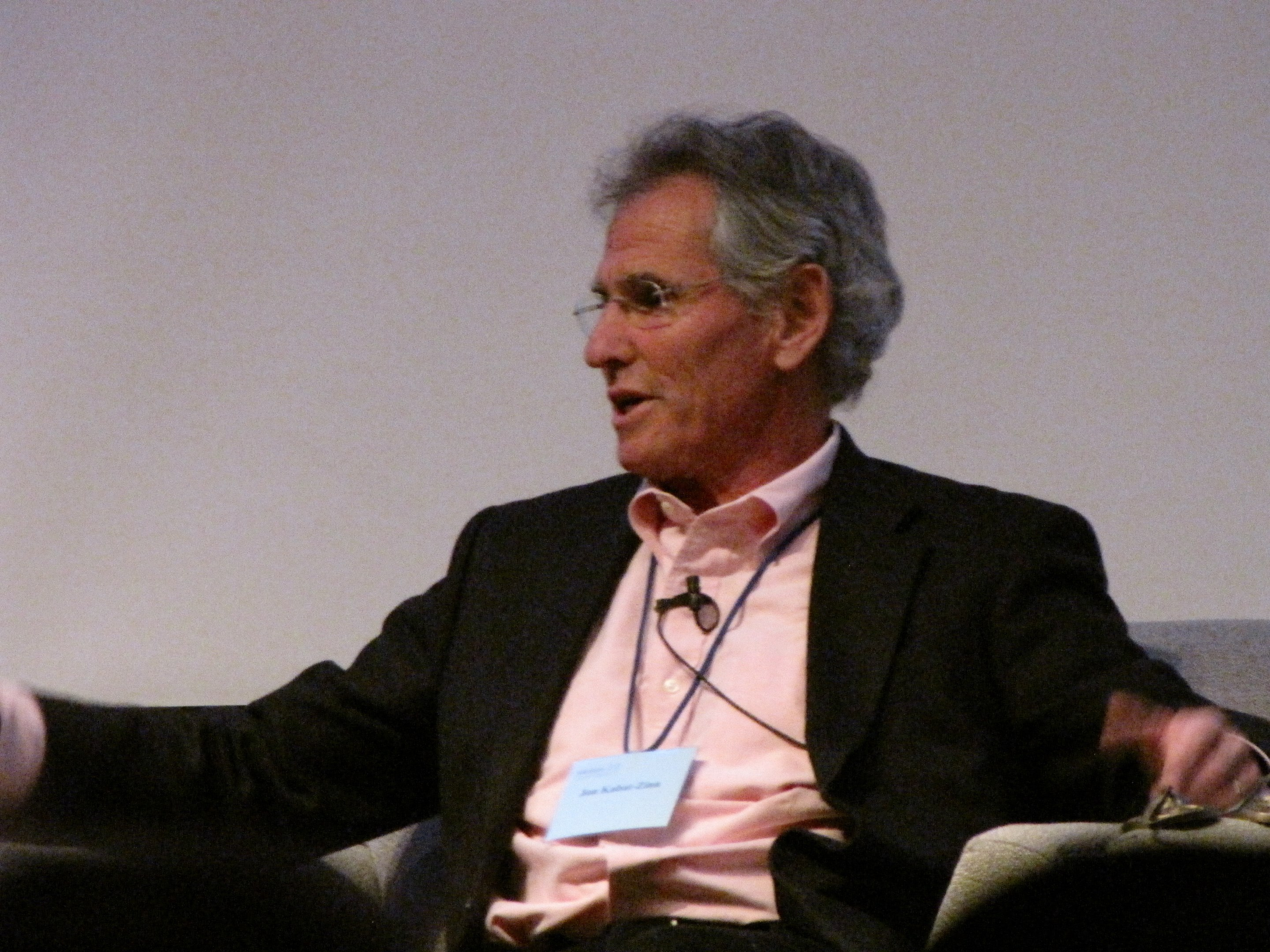
Jon Kabat-Zinn, founder of the Mindfulness Based Stress Reduction Clinic and a student of Zen Buddhist teachers like Philip Kapleau and Thich Nhat Hanh.

Buddhist spiritual practices like meditation have also been compared to cognitive behavioral therapy techniques. During the late 20th century, numerous studies were conducted on the psychological effects of certain Buddhist meditation practices (such as vipassana and zazen). Furthermore, Buddhist mindfulness practices influenced the development of new forms of cognitive therapies, which are known as mindfulness-based cognitive therapies. One of the most influential of these therapies is Jon Kabat-Zinn's Mindfulness-based stress reduction (MBSR).

The growing popularity of Buddhist meditation and Buddhist influenced mindfulness meditation has also led to research on the physiological and neurological effects of meditation practices (carried out by figures such as Richard Davidson) as well as to dialogues on the nature of the human mind, which have been enthusiastically encouraged by the present Dalai Lama, Tenzin Gyatso. One of the first westerners to study the neurology of meditation was James H. Austin, the author of Zen and the Brain (1998). A more recent overview of related research findings can be found in Davidson and Goleman's Altered Traits, which discusses studies done with the aid of Buddhist monks like Matthieu Ricard and Mingyur Rinpoche. The number of studies on Buddhist and Buddhist-derived meditation techniques skyrocketed in the 21st century (in 2015, there were 674 such studies) and their results were widely reported in the popular press. This also led to a cottage industry of popular books on Buddhist and mindfulness meditation and the adoption of secularized meditation in major corporations.

William Edelglass has argued that the modern study of meditation and happiness is implicitly founded on a Western notion of happiness as positive affect or pleasure (which are most often measured through experience sampling and self-reporting). Edelglass contrasts this notion of happiness with the Buddhist view found in the work of Śāntideva and other ancient Buddhist sources that sees meditation (and other virtues, such as the six perfections) as ways to develop wisdom and transform oneself in a radical, highly ethical fashion by letting go of all attachments. The Buddhist perspective also rejects sensual pleasures as worthless and is opposed to the maximization of positive affect for its own sake (indeed, it sees this as counterproductive).

=== Cognitive science ===
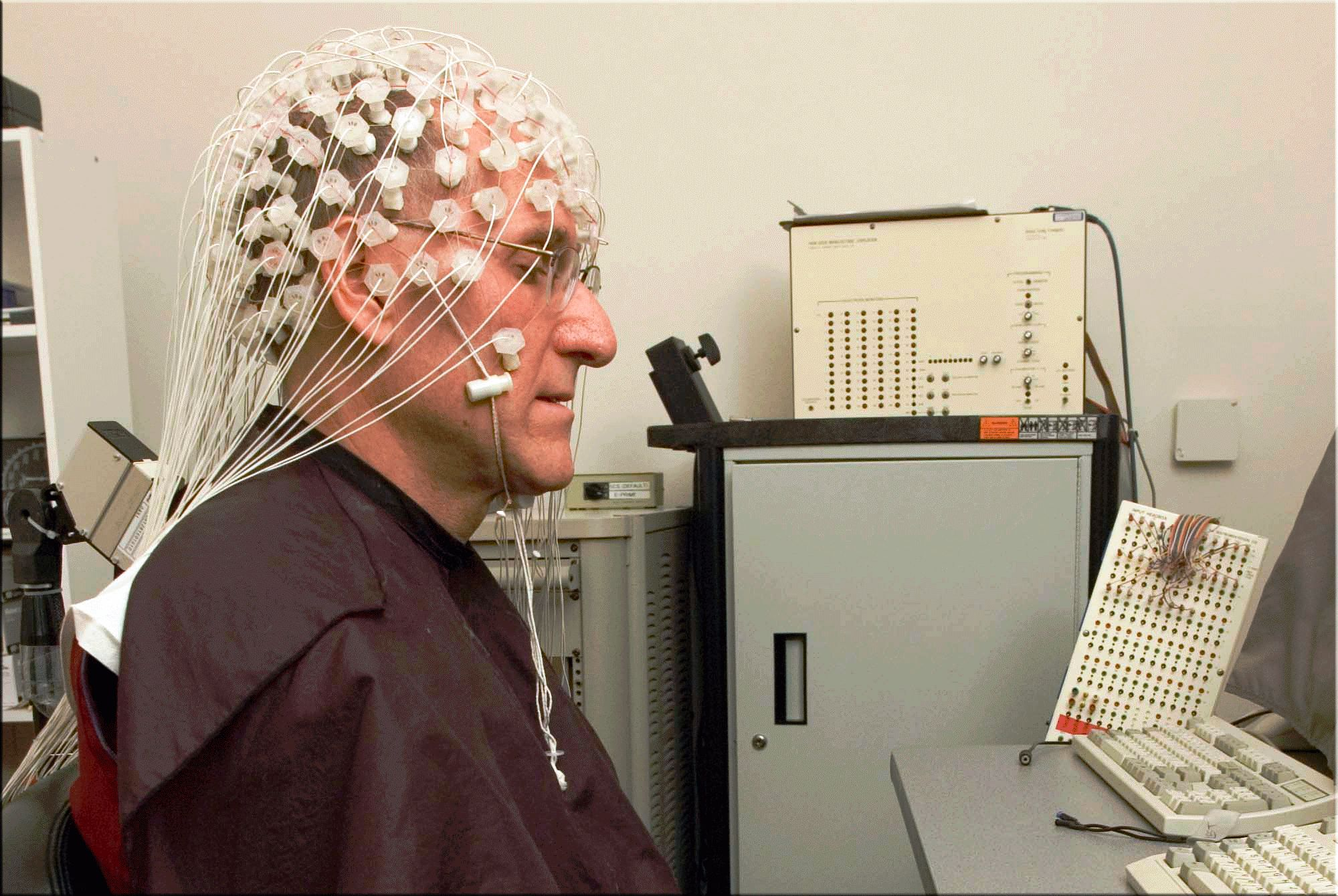
Buddhist monk Barry Kerzin participating in meditation research.

Various studies have shown that Buddhist and mindfulness meditators experience long term transformations in cognitive function and neural activity. However, as Jay L. Garfield notes, this should not be surprising (to scientists or to Buddhists), since meditation is one kind of cognitive expertise and it is therefore normal that it should have neural correlates. Similarly, for Buddhists, the interdependence of mind and body is an ancient view.

Garfield also argues that cognitive science might have much to contribute to the development of Buddhist philosophy, since ancient Buddhist thinkers do not discuss important issues related to attention, memory and perception (such as inattentional blindness). Furthermore, the Buddhist epistemic focus on an empirical understanding of causal processes "commits Buddhists theorists of mind to attend to contemporary scientific results concerning the mind." Garfield thinks that the greatest contribution that Buddhism can make lies in the field of moral psychology and positive psychology, which is highly sophisticated in Buddhist thought.

Evan Thompson writes that the neuroscientific study of mindfulness tends to view mindfulness a private inner observation (or meta-awareness) which is then conceptualized as neural networks that are studied in brain imaging tools. Thompson thinks this confuses the biological markers for mindfulness (such as decreased amygdala reactivity, relative deactivation of the default-mode network, and slower baseline respiration rate) for mindfulness itself, which is actually "a host of cognitive, affective, and bodily skills" which are situated in an ethical way of life and in a particular socio-cultural setting. Thompson thinks that applying insights from embodied cognition, such as the "enactive approach to cognition", can help Buddhist scholars understand better how mindfulness functions as an aspect of the entire embodied person and how it relates to the study of mediation, which would more effectively be done through the perspective of cognitive ecology.

Similarly, David McMahan thinks that Buddhist meditation practices are situated in specific religious, conceptual and socio-cultural contexts, that is, ways of being-in-the-world (referring to "Lifeworlds" and "social imaginaries"). These ways of being are altered, secularized, modernized and abstracted out when Buddhist meditation is studied in a clinical setting and viewed in terms of an individual's internal states that are caused by the meditation technique. According to McMahan, the general assumption of those who study meditation is that meditation techniques can be studied in isolation, but this is likely to be mistaken since "meditation "works" as a systemic part of the ecology of a sociocultural system." A similar contextual critique has been put forth by Robert H. Sharf.

==== The problem of scientific materialism ====
Buddhism rejects all materialistic theories which attempt to reduce consciousness to the functions of physical properties. The 14th Dalai Lama states that "from the Buddhist perspective, the mental realm cannot be reduced to the world of matter, though it may depend upon that world to function." Because of this, while Buddhists like the Dalai Lama embrace the findings and methods of neuroscience, they do not accept the assumptions of some neuroscientists that consciousness can be fully explained as a function of the brain (which is a metaphysical assumption). He further argues that "there is as yet no scientific basis for such a categorical claim," since neuroscience mainly studies correlations between brain states and first person pare "grounded in the phenomenology of experience" and "include the contemplative techniques of meditation" could assist in the development of a more holistic cognitive science that makes use of introspection. The Dalai Lama sees these methods as first person empirical processes.

This idea is also supported by B. Alan Wallace, who argues that modern cognitive science is held back by materialist assumptions and its desire to study consciousness (which is subjective and qualitative) through quantitative measuring of its physical correlates. However, since Wallace argues that the correlates of consciousness are not equivalent to consciousness itself, this method creates a blind spot in cognitive science (which also ignores the hard problem of consciousness). Wallace argues that the contemplative skills found in traditions like Buddhism can aid in the development of a rigorous form of introspection which could be used in cognitive science to deliver a better understanding of the mind.

Geoffrey Samuel notes how the Buddhist point of view has often clashed with the reductionist and materialistic assumptions of many modern neuroscientists. He suggests that the question of personal identity and the self "might provide an important starting point" for a critical revision of the assumptions of modern science which focuses on the study of individual brains. He points to the 'enactive' and 'ecological' approach to consciousness by figures like Francisco Varela and Gregory Bateson as a more fruitful ground for the dialogue between Buddhism and science, since these theories "see cognition, and consciousness in general, as part of an ongoing process in which both 'world' and 'mind' are constituted through mutual interaction". According to Samuel, Varela "argued that the upwards causation of conventional neuroscience, in which consciousness is seen as derivative of the body, needs to be complemented by a downwards causation from the emergent structures of the self, which develop within the neural system as part of the process of maturation of each human being".

== Buddhism and other related fields ==
=== History of science ===
José Ignacio Cabezón has discussed how historians of science seek to understand the origins of science and why its rise was much more successful in Europe. Some of these figures such as Stanley Jaki have argued that it is because Europe was dominated by the Christian worldview (with its linear view of time and de-animized view of nature) that it gave rise to modern science, while this could not have happened in Buddhist Asia (which generally held a cyclic view of time and accepted polytheism/animism).

However, Cabezón notes that India and China "did give rise to forms of empirically derived sciences that can be recognized as such even in Western terms." He points to the work of Joseph Needham (author of the long running series of books called Science and Civilisation in China) as an example. Furthermore, Cabezón also notes that neither animism nor a cyclic theory of time "acted as deterrents to the acceptance of science in these various cultures since its movement east, something that would be expected were Jaki's thesis true." On the contrary, these religious cultures embraced science rapidly.

=== Philosophy of science ===
B. Alan Wallace's Choosing Reality (1996) is one work which discusses Buddhism in regards to the philosophy of science. Wallace argues that science is not metaphysically neutral, and that the two main metaphysical views in the philosophy of science have been scientific realism and instrumentalism. Wallace thinks these two theories fail to provide a proper philosophical foundation for science and instead argues in favor of the Buddhism Madhyamaka philosophy. Wallace also argues that Buddhism can complement science by providing a spirit of responsibility and service for others, a spirit that has been lost as science became separated from religion and philosophy.

In Hidden Dimensions (2007), Wallace also cites the ideas of some modern physicists which have argued for alternative ontologies to materialism or physicalism. These figures include Bohm (and his "implicate order"), Wolfgang Pauli's idea (developed along with Jung) of the unus mundus, George Ellis' fourfold model of reality (matter and forces, consciousness, physical and biological possibilities, and mathematical reality) as well as the views of Eugene Wigner and Bernard d'Espagnat.

Wallace has also compared John Archibald Wheeler's participatory anthropic principle (which sees scientific concepts like matter, mass and so on as "creations of the human mind, not discovered in the pre-existing, objective world of nature") to the Madhyamaka view which sees a deep interdependence between subjects and objects. Wallace thinks that "such parallels suggest that meaningful theoretical collaboration could take place between physicists and Buddhist philosophers and contemplatives."

Mark T. Unno sees the ontology of David Bohm as being similar to the Mahayana Buddhist philosophy of the twofold truth (of form and emptiness). According to Unno, David Bohm "suggests that mind and matter, thought and thing, are mutually implicit, as are all other phenomena, such that there is a wholeness to the universe in which all distinctions ultimately dissolve." Since, for Bohm, "there is no definable divide between mind and matter," there is a kind of wholeness to the universe which cannot be understood conceptually or discursively, but "can only be ultimately realized in the present moment, inseparable from the subject." According to Unno, the same is true for the Buddhist view of emptiness. This is not surprising, since according to Unno, Bohm was "influenced by Indian philosopher Jiddu Krishnamurti and Buddhist thinkers such as the Dalai Lama."

==== Philosophy of physics ====
Michel Bitbol has argued that Buddhist Madhyamaka philosophy can help provide a useful philosophical framework for quantum mechanics. According to Bitbol, there is

a thorough and detailed structural analogy between quantum contextuality and Buddhist Śūnyatā (emptiness of own-being); and between quantum entanglement and Buddhist Pratîtyasamutpâda (dependent origination). But this twofold analogy does not show that there is a single essence of reality which can be disclosed by our reason irrespective of whether we rely on an experimental approach or a contemplative approach. The analogy rather shows that, at a sufficiently accurate level of analysis and careful attention, the negative conclusions of experimental physicists and contemplative Buddhists are bound to be similar: both realize the approximative status of the reified entities of everyday life, and both must cope with the high amount of instability and lack of self-sufficient existence (Śūnyatā) of phenomena. Then, if thoroughly applied, the critical concept of Śūnyatā can be seen to underpin the anti-metaphysical stances of both Buddhism and certain trends in the contemporary philosophy of science.

The American physicist David Ritz Finkelstein developed a theory of "universal relativity," influenced by Madhyamaka philosophy and his discussions at the Mind and Life dialogues. Finkelstein believes that "a philosophical argument for a universal relativity could be a useful guide for future physics," since "the major changes in physics in this century have been extensions of relativity at one level or another, and I think a further extension is due." Finkelstein's theory is based on the view that all laws of nature are ultimately relative and non-absolute. In this theory, doing (change) and knowing (attempting to fix a process in place) are relative elements.

==== Anthropic principle ====
Matthieu Ricard, commenting on the question of the anthropic principle and fine-tuning (which states that life is dependent on certain fundamental physical constants whose exact values are improbable), states that:

As far as Buddhism is concerned, the idea that there is some principle of organization that is supposed to have tuned the universe perfectly so that the conscious mind could evolve is fundamentally misguided. The apparently amazing fine-tuning is explained simply by the fact that the physical constants and consciousness have always coexisted in a universe that has no beginning and no end.... The universe has not been adjusted by a great watchmaker so that consciousness can exist. The universe and consciousness have always coexisted and so cannot exclude each other. To coexist, phenomena must be mutually suitable. The problem with the anthropic principle, or any other teleological theory, is that it puts the constants before consciousness and thus claims that the constants exist only so that they can create consciousness.

== Modern reception ==
=== Modern scientists on Buddhism ===
Niels Bohr, who developed the Bohr Model of the atom, said,

For a parallel to the lesson of atomic theory...[we must turn] to those kinds of epistemological problems with which already thinkers like the Buddha and Lao Tzu have been confronted, when trying to harmonize our position as spectators and actors in the great drama of existence.

The American physicist J. Robert Oppenheimer made an analogy to Buddhism when describing the Heisenberg uncertainty principle:

If we ask, for instance, whether the position of the electron remains the same, we must say 'no;' if we ask whether the electron's position changes with time, we must say 'no;' if we ask whether the electron is at rest, we must say 'no;' if we ask whether it is in motion, we must say 'no.' The Buddha has given such answers when interrogated as to the conditions of man's self after his death; but they are not familiar answers for the tradition of seventeenth and eighteenth-century science.

Nobel Prize–winning physicist Albert Einstein, who developed the general theory of relativity and the special theory of relativity, also known for his mass–energy equivalence, described Buddhism as containing a strong cosmic element:

...there is found a third level of religious experience, even if it is seldom found in a pure form. I will call it the cosmic religious sense. This is hard to make clear to those who do not experience it, since it does not involve an anthropomorphic idea of God; the individual feels the vanity of human desires and aims, and the nobility and marvelous order which are revealed in nature and in the world of thought. He feels the individual destiny as an imprisonment and seeks to experience the totality of existence as a unity full of significance. Indications of this cosmic religious sense can be found even on earlier levels of development—for example, in the Psalms of David and in the Prophets. The cosmic element is much stronger in Buddhism, as, in particular, Schopenhauer's magnificent essays have shown us. The religious geniuses of all times have been distinguished by this cosmic religious sense, which recognizes neither dogmas nor God made in man's image. Consequently there cannot be a church whose chief doctrines are based on the cosmic religious experience. It comes about, therefore, that we find precisely among the heretics of all ages men who were inspired by this highest religious experience; often they appeared to their contemporaries as atheists, but sometimes also as saints.

=== Modern Buddhists on science ===
The 14th Dalai Lama is known for his interest in science and has gone on record to say that Buddhism must conform to proven scientific findings:

My confidence in venturing into science lies in my basic belief that as in science so in Buddhism, understanding the nature of reality is pursued by means of critical investigation: if scientific analysis were conclusively to demonstrate certain claims in Buddhism to be false, then we must accept the findings of science and abandon those claims.

The Dalai Lama argues that science and spirituality are related, though they work on different levels:

The great benefit of science is that it can contribute tremendously to the alleviation of suffering at the physical level, but it is only through the cultivation of the qualities of the human heart and the transformation of our attitudes that we can begin to address and overcome mental suffering. In other words, the enhancement of fundamental human values is indispensable to our basic quest for happiness. Therefore, from the perspective of human well-being, science and spirituality are not unrelated. We need both, since the alleviation of suffering must take place at both the physical and psychological levels.

== See also ==
- Buddhism and evolution
- Buddhism and Western Philosophy
- Buddhist philosophy
- Index of Buddhism-related articles
- Issues in Science and Religion
- Quantum mysticism
- Relationship between religion and science
- Religious Science
- Secular Buddhism

== Sources ==
- De Silva, Padmasiri (2005) An Introduction to Buddhist Psychology, 4th edition, Palgrave Macmillan.
- Clayton, Philip (editor) (2006). The Oxford Handbook of Religion and Science. Oxford University Press.
- Goleman, Daniel (in collaboration with The Dalai Lama), Destructive Emotions, Bloomsbury (London UK 2003)
- Gyatso, Tenzin (The 14th Dalai Lama) (2005). The Universe in a Single Atom: The Convergence of Science and Spirituality. Morgan Road Books. ISBN 0-7679-2066-X
- Hammerstrom, Erik J. (2015). The Science of Chinese Buddhism: Early Twentieth-Century Engagements. Columbia University Press.
- Kirthisinghe, Buddhadasa P. (editor) (1993) Buddhism and Science. Motilal Banarsidass.
- McMahan, David, "Modernity and the Discourse of Scientific Buddhism." Journal of the American Academy of Religion, Vol. 72, No. 4 (2004), 897–933.
- McMahan, David L.; Braun, Erik (2017). Meditation, Buddhism, and Science. Oxford University Press.
- Numrich, Paul David. (2008). The Boundaries of Knowledge in Buddhism, Christianity, and Science. Vandenhoeck & Ruprecht.
- Lopez Jr., Donald S. (2009). Buddhism and Science: A Guide for the Perplexed. University of Chicago Press.
- Lopez Jr., Donald S. (2012). The Scientific Buddha: His Short and Happy Life. Yale University Press.
- Rapgay L, Rinpoche VL, Jessum R, Exploring the nature and functions of the mind: a Tibetan Buddhist meditative perspective, Prog. Brain Res. 2000 vol 122 pp 507–15
- Ricard, Matthieu; Trinh Xuan Thuan (2009). The Quantum and the Lotus: A Journey to the Frontiers Where Science and Buddhism Meet, Crown Publishers, New York.
- Robin Cooper, The Evolving Mind: Buddhism, Biology and Consciousness, Windhorse (Birmingham UK 1996)
- Sarunya Prasopchingchana & Dana Sugu, 'Distinctiveness of the Unseen Buddhist Identity' (International Journal of Humanistic Ideology, Cluj-Napoca, Romania, vol. 4, 2010)
- Sharf, Robert H. "Buddhist Modernism and the Rhetoric of Meditative Experience." Numen 42, no. 3 (1995a): 228–83.
- Wallace, B. Alan (2007). Hidden Dimensions: The Unification of Physics and Consciousness (Columbia Univ Press)
- Wallace, B. Alan (2003) (ed), Buddhism and Science: breaking new ground (Columbia University Press) ISBN 0-231-12334-5
- Wallace, B. Alan (1996), Choosing Reality: A Buddhist Perspective of Physics and the Mind, (Snow Lion 1996)
- Wright, Robert (2017). Why Buddhism is True: The Science and Philosophy of Meditation and Enlightenment. Simon and Schuster.
- Zajonc, Arthur (editor) (2004). The New Physics and Cosmology: Dialogues with the Dalai Lama. Oxford University Press
