= Buddhist views on evolution =

Buddhists' perspectives on the scientific theory of evolution

Buddhism is generally accepting of scientific explanations for the origin and development of life and the universe, including modern scientific theories of evolution and cosmology. Many Buddhist scholars and teachers view evolution as consistent with the principles of change and causality emphasized in Buddhist philosophy. Some early Buddhist texts, such as the Aggañña Sutta, can be read as broadly compatible with evolutionary concepts. Buddhists show some of the highest acceptance rates of evolution among religious groups. In The Universe in a Single Atom: The Convergence of Science and Spirituality, the 14th Dalai Lama supports evolution but expresses philosophical concerns about random mutation as a complete explanation: "From the Buddhist's perspective, the idea of these mutations being random events is deeply unsatisfying for a theory that purports to explain the origin of life."

Religious Differences on the Question of Evolution (United States, 2007) Percentage who agree that evolution is the best explanation for the origin of human life on earth Source: Pew Forum
Buddhist	81%
Hindu	80%
Jewish	77%
Unaffiliated	72%
Catholic	58%
Orthodox	54%
Mainline Protestant	51%
Muslim	45%
Hist. Black Protest.	38%
Evang. Protestant	24%
Mormon	22%
Jehovah's Witnesses	8%
Total U.S. population	48%

== See also ==
- Buddhism and science
- Dependent origination
- Aggañña Sutta
- Religious views of evolution
- Big Bang in religion
