= Sah D'Simone =

Brazilian-born meditation teacher

- Born: Brazil
- Occupations: Meditation teacher, Spiritual guide, Author & Transformational speaker
- Website: www.sahdsimone.com

Sah D'Simone is a Brazilian-born meditation teacher, spiritual guide, author and transformational speaker. He is known for creating The Sah Method, a technique that implements ecstatic dance, meditation, breathwork and mantra to support the awakening of human hearts. His spiritual healing approach blends ancient Tantric Buddhism, modern contemplative psychology, meditation, breathwork and integrative nutrition.

Sah has been featured in notable magazines and resources including USA Today, Refinery29, Vice, and others. He has also been featured as a TEDx speaker.

Sah is the author of 5-Minute Daily Meditations, and Spiritually Sassy: 8 Radical Steps to Activate Your Innate Superpowers. He is the founder of Spiritually Sassy School platform and the presenter of the podcast titled The Spiritually Sassy Show.
