= Han F. de Wit =

- Born: 1944 (age 81–82); Wormerveer
- Citizenship: Dutch, United States
- Education: University of Amsterdam, University of California
- Known for: Founding of Contemplative Psychology in the Netherlands, Founding Shambhala center 1977 in Amsterdam, Wagner Group associate.
- Scientific career
- Fields: Psychology, Contemplative Psychology, Mediation, Buddhism, Dharma
- Workplaces: Vrije Universiteit

Han Frederik de Wit (born 1944) is a research psychologist at the University of Amsterdam in 1974. He moved to expanded outside the formal psychology field in search for guidance in his spirituality. De Wit became internationally acknowledged as one of the founders of Contemplative Psychology. Today he teaches meditation at the Shambhala centers in the Netherlands and instructs seminars in the psychology of Buddhism.

== Spirituality and influences ==
De Wit was interested in the human experience and the power of the mind. After his psychology root he began a new educational direction towards the answering of life questions like: “Why is it that people experience similar situations in such different ways? What does that tell us about the nature of mind?” long term practitioner of the Kagyu and Nyingma lineages of Vajrayana Buddhism. After reading Chögyam Trungpa's Cutting Through Spiritual Materialism, it influenced him to travel to North America and expound on Trungpa's teachings. His other influences included Nelson Mandela, Dag Hammarskjöld, Martin Luther King Jr., Mother Teresa, the Dalai Lama, Thich Nhat Hanh, and Etty Hillesum. In De Wit's book De Verborgen Bloei (The Hidden Flowering) he asks many of the questions that have helped him through his spiritual path:

"Why is it that one human being becomes wiser and gentler during his lifetime while another becomes more hard-hearted and shortsighted to the needs of others? What is it that causes some people to experience and radiate an increasing measure of joy in their lives while others become increasingly anxious and fearful? And why do some people develop the ability to cope with suffering? How is it that these two such divergent psychological developments can occur under similar circumstances, whether favorable or unfavorable? And finally, can we influence this development or does it lie it beyond our control?"

== Practice and career ==
De Wit actively studies how to expand and shape "western psychological language" in a way that incorporates Buddhist view of mind and the practice meditation. His practice encompasses that the psychology contained in the spiritual traditions "is one of the greatest treasures of humanity." De Wit suggests that spiritual tradition can be viewed as its own school of psychology and used to enrich the study, meanwhile being used for personal practical vale for those who travel on their own spiritual path.

== Contemplative studies ==
Contemplative Studies are a growing educational area focused on the incorporation of philosophy, psychology, and phenomenology across time, cultures and traditions. Brown University has declared Contemplative Studies as an official concentration. This concentration is an academic approach combined from the humanities and sciences to analyze the cultural, historical, and scientific underpinnings of contemplative experiences in religion, art, music, and literature. The ultimate goal is in the journey of finding and understanding the human experience in the "first person".

=== Contemplative psychology ===
In the book Contemplative Psychology De Wit's goal was to establish a unifying language between contemplative psychology and academic psychology. He promotes a mixture of religious traditions and science to make the psychological perspective and approach more meaningful. His book discusses "The Mental Domain in Contemplative Psychology"; the framework and practical method for contemplative traditions and how the traditions work their way in to achieving the higher insight in psychological practice. De Wit said, "The assumption of contemplative psychology is that human beings have a certain degree of freedom to shape their own minds.They have the freedom to imprison themselves within a state of mind, and the freedom to liberate themselves from it. And because our mind determines what we say and do, the way this freedom is used manifests in our actions and speech, which in turn is felt in our personal lives and our society.

=== Buddhism and meditation in psychology ===
Buddhist meditation in contemplative psychology is "the systematic use of non-conceptual mindfulness". What is hindering academic psychology is conceptual experience distracting us from non-conceptual experience: Buddhism and mindfulness betters ones ability to experience one's thoughts. Wit's most recent book Buddhism for Thinkers was written alongside Jeroen Hopster, a historian and philosopher, to compare Western philosophy and Eastern Buddhist tradition and practices. The two discuss "Inner Experience" as a source of knowledge and how Western culture has diverged from this source especially in the sciences.

== Publications ==
=== Books ===
- "Contemplative Psychology", Agora, 2000, 4th revised edition
- "The Flourishing: The Psychological Backgrounds of Spirituality", Agora, 2003, 11th edition
- "The Lotus and the Rose: Buddhism in Dialogue with Psychology, Religion and Ethics", Agora 2003, 4th edition
- "The Three Jewels", in March 2005, published by Ten Have
- "The Open Field of Experience", in 2008, published by Ten Have
- "Wisdom in Emotion", in 2013, published by Ten Have
