= Spiritual materialism =

Term coined by Chögyam Trungpa

Spiritual materialism is a term coined by Chögyam Trungpa in his book Cutting Through Spiritual Materialism. The book is a compendium of his talks explaining Buddhism given while opening the Karma Dzong meditation center in Boulder, Colorado. He expands on the concept in later seminars that became books such as Work, Sex, Money. He uses the term to describe mistakes spiritual seekers commit which turn the pursuit of spirituality into an ego-building and confusion-creating endeavor, based on the idea that ego development is counter to spiritual progress.

Conventionally, it is used to describe capitalist and spiritual narcissism, commercial efforts such as "new age" bookstores and wealthy lecturers on spirituality; it might also mean the attempt to build up a list of credentials or accumulate teachings in order to present oneself as a more realized or holy person. Author Jorge Ferrer equates the terms "Spiritual materialism" and "Spiritual Narcissism", though others draw a distinction, that spiritual narcissism is believing that one deserves love and respect or is better than another because one has accumulated spiritual training instead of the belief that accumulating training will bring an end to suffering.

== Lords of Materialism ==
In Trungpa's presentation, spiritual materialism can fall into three categories — what he calls the three "Lords of Materialism" (Tibetan: lalo literally "barbarian") — in which a form of materialism is misunderstood as bringing long-term happiness but instead brings only short-term entertainment followed by long-term suffering:

1. Physical materialism is the belief that possessions can bring release from suffering. In Trungpa's view, they may bring temporary happiness but then more suffering in the endless pursuit of creating one's environment to be just right. Or on another level it may cause a misunderstanding like, "I am rich because I have this or that" or "I am a teacher (or whatever) because I have a diploma (or whatever)."
2. Psychological materialism is the belief that a particular philosophy, belief system, or point of view will bring release from suffering. So seeking refuge by strongly identifying with a particular religion, philosophy, political party or viewpoint, for example, would be psychological materialism. From this the conventional usage of spiritual materialism arises, by identifying oneself as Buddhist or some other label, or by collecting initiations and spiritual accomplishments, one further constructs a solidified view of ego. Trungpa characterizes the goal of psychological materialism as using external concepts, pretexts, and ideas to prove that the ego-driven self exists, which manifests in a particular competitive attitude.
3. Spiritual materialism is the belief that a certain temporary state of mind is a refuge from suffering. An example would be using meditation practices to create a peaceful state of mind, or using drugs or alcohol to remain in a numbed out or a euphoric state. According to Trungpa, these states are temporary and merely heighten the suffering when they cease. So attempting to maintain a particular emotional state of mind as a refuge from suffering, or constantly pursuing particular emotional states of mind like being in love, will actually lead to more long-term suffering.

== Ego ==
The underlying source of these three approaches to finding happiness is based, according to Trungpa, on the mistaken notion that one's ego is inherently existent and a valid point of view. He claims that is incorrect, and therefore the materialistic approaches have an invalid basis to begin with. The message in summary is, "Don't try to reinforce your ego through material things, belief systems like religion, or certain emotional states of mind." In his view, the point of religion is to show you that your ego doesn't really exist inherently. Ego is something you build up to make you think you exist, but it is not necessary and in the long run causes more suffering.
