= Kobori Nanrei Sohaku =

Kobori Nanrei Sōhaku
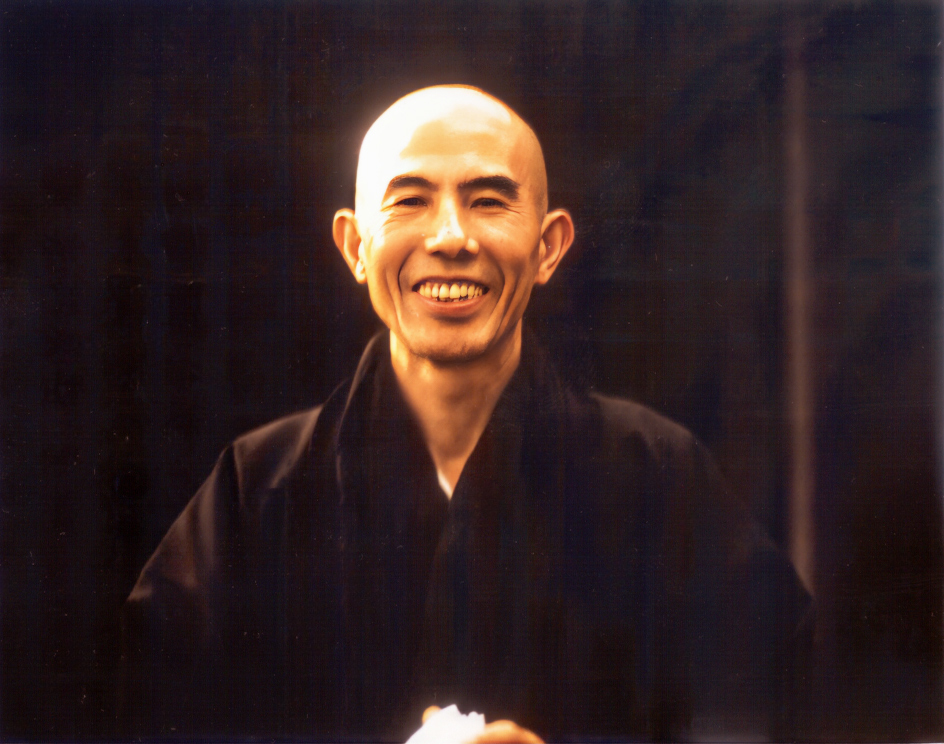
- Title: Roshi

Personal life
- Born: 1918 Japan
- Died: 1992 (aged 73–74)

Religious life
- Religion: Buddhism
- School: Rinzai

Senior posting
- Based in: Ryōkōin
- Students: James H. Austin

Kobori Nanrei Sōhaku (小堀 南嶺) (1918—1992) was a Japanese Rinzai roshi and former abbot of Ryōkōin, a subtemple of Daitoku-ji in Kyoto, Japan. A student of the late Daisetz Teitaro Suzuki, Sōhaku was fluent in English and known to hold regular sesshins until the 1980s which many Americans attended. One of his American students is James H. Austin, author of Zen and the Brain. Austin writes of his teacher, "This remarkable person, Kobori-roshi, inspired me to begin the long path of Zen and stick to it. As a result, I have since continued to repair my ignorance about Zen and its psychophysiology during an ongoing process of adult reeducation."

A collection of dialogue with Kobori Nanrei Sohaku is recently published in Kindle Book Series of Amazon with a title of A DIALOGUE WITH ZEN MASTER, KOBORI NAREI SOHAKU. by one of his followers Dr. Akira Hasegawa, Professor Emeritus, Osaka University. The book was originally published by Tankosha, Kyoto, with a title The one world of Lao Tzu and modern physics : a dialogue with a Zen abbot ISBN 4-473-01373-1. Most zen masters do not go out to preach although they take a position that the gate is always open. Abbot Kobori is no exception. When the book was originally published by Tankosha, he declined to show his name on the cover. Hasegawa decided republish the book with the title having Mr. Kobori's name on the cover now.
