= Zen and the Brain =

1998 book by James H. Austin

Zen and the Brain: Toward an Understanding of Meditation and Consciousness
- Author: James H. Austin
- Language: English
- Subject: Neuroscience, Zen
- Publisher: MIT Press
- Publication date: 6 February 1998
- Publication place: United States
- Media type: Print (trade paperback)
- Pages: 844
- ISBN: 978-0-262-01164-8
- OCLC: 37187487
- Dewey Decimal: 294.3/422
- LC Class: BQ9288.A96
- Followed by: Chase, Chance, and Creativity: The Lucky Art of Novelty

Zen and the Brain: Toward an Understanding of Meditation and Consciousness is a 1998 book by neurologist and Zen practitioner James H. Austin, in which the author attempts to establish links between the neurological workings of the human brain and meditation. The eventual goal would be to establish mechanisms by which meditation induces changes in the activity of the brain, which in turn induces a state of mental clarity. For example, Austin presents evidence from EEG scans that deep relaxed breathing reduces brain activity.

The publishers described their book as a "Comprehensive text on the evidence from neuroscience that helps to clarify which brain mechanisms underlie the subjective states of Zen, and employs Zen to 'illuminate' how the brain works in various states of consciousness". Austin starts with a discussion of Zen Buddhism, its goals, and practices. Having laid this groundwork, he then turns to explore the neurological basis of consciousness.

Austin wrote a follow-up, Zen-Brain Reflections.

== See also ==
- Neurotheology
- Rational mysticism
