= James H. Austin =

American neurologist and author

James H. Austin is an American neurologist and author. He is the author of the book Zen and the Brain. It establishes links between the neurophysiology of the human brain and the practice of meditation, and won the Scientific and Medical Network Book Prize for 1998. He has written five sequels: Zen-Brain Reflections (2006), Selfless Insight (2009), Meditating Selflessly (2011), Zen-Brain Horizons (2014) and Living Zen Remindfully (2016).

== Career ==
Austin has been an academic neurologist for most of his career, first at the University of Oregon Medical School, then as chairman of neurology at the University of Colorado School of Medicine. He is currently Emeritus professor of neurology at the University of Colorado Medical School, Denver and visiting professor of neurology at the University of Florida College of Medicine. His publications number over 140 articles involving research in the areas of clinical neurology, neuropathology, neurochemistry and neuropharmacology.

== Experience with Zen ==
Austin has been a practicing Zen Buddhist since 1974. He began in Kyoto at Daitoku-ji as a student of the Rinzai roshi Kobori Nanrei Sohaku.

After eight years of regular Zen meditation, Austin experienced the taste of what Zen practice calls kenshō. The chief characteristic of this experience was a loss of the sense of "self" which is so central to human identity, plus a feeling that "Just This" is the way all things really are in the world. While he was on a sabbatical in England, he was waiting for an Underground train when he suddenly entered a state of enlightenment unlike anything he had ever experienced. In Austin's words, "It strikes unexpectedly at 9 am on the surface platform of the London subway system. [Due to a mistake] ... I wind up at a station where I have never been before...The view includes the dingy interior of the station, some grimy buildings, a bit of open sky above and beyond. Instantly the entire view acquires three qualities: Absolute Reality, Intrinsic Rightness, Ultimate Perfection."

"With no transition, it is all complete....Yes, there is the paradox of this extraordinary viewing. But there is no viewer. The scene is utterly empty, stripped of every last extension of an I-Me-Mine [his name for ego-self]. Vanished in one split second is the familiar sensation that this person is viewing an ordinary city scene. The new viewing proceeds impersonally, not pausing to register the paradox that there is no human subject "doing" it. Three insights penetrate the experient, each conveying Total Understanding at depths far beyond simple knowledge: This is the eternal state of affairs. There is nothing more to do. There is nothing whatsoever to fear."

Austin writes that when his former subjective self was no longer there to form biased interpretations this experience conveyed the impression of "objective reality." As a neurologist, he interpreted this experience not as proof of a reality beyond the comprehension of our senses but as arising from the brain itself. This and other experiences and research led him to write Zen and the Brain.

== Bibliography ==
- AUSTIN James H., 2020 "Zen and the Brain: The James H. Austin Omnibus Edition, on Nook at https://www.barnesandnoble.com/w/zen-and-the-brain-james-h-austin-md/1129374916 (Meditating Selflessly, Zen-Brain Horizons, and Living Zen Remindfully published by MIT Press 8/02/2018).
- AUSTIN James H., 2019 Living Zen Remindfully audiobook. MIT Press.
- AUSTIN James H., 2016 Living Zen Remindfully: Retraining Subconscious Awareness. MIT Press.
- AUSTIN James H., 2014 Zen-Brain Horizons: Toward a Living Zen. MIT Press.
- AUSTIN James H., 2011 Meditating Selflessly: Practical Neural Zen. MIT Press.
- AUSTIN James H., 2009 Selfless Insight: Zen and the Meditative Transformations of Consciousness. MIT Press.
- AUSTIN James H., 2006 Zen-Brain Reflections: Reviewing Recent Developments in Meditation and States of Consciousness. MIT Press.
- AUSTIN James H., 1998 Zen and the Brain: Toward an Understanding of Meditation and Consciousness. MIT Press.
- AUSTIN James H., 1978 Chase, Chance and Creativity: The Lucky Art of Novelty. The MIT Press, 2003, 245 pp., $18.95, paperback. ISBN 0-262-51135-5.

== Notes and references ==
Journal of Neuropathology and Experimental Neurolog. Studies in Globoid (Krabbe) Leukodystrophy: III—Significance of Experimentally-Produced Globoid-Like Elements in Rat White Matter and Spleen https://academic.oup.com/jnen/article-abstract/24/2/265/2612255
