= Religious interpretations of the Big Bang theory =

Since the emergence of the Big Bang theory as the dominant physical cosmological paradigm, there have been a variety of reactions by religious groups regarding its implications for religious cosmologies. Some accept the scientific evidence at face value, some seek to harmonize the Big Bang with their religious tenets, and some reject or ignore the evidence for the Big Bang theory.

The core tenet of most major monotheistic religions such as is that there is one God who created the universe and bestowed his blessings upon it. These faiths are generally in agreement with contemporary scientific cosmological thought as they believe the Big Bang theory generally reinforces the idea of one supreme God. However, this viewpoint is not universal amongst practicers of these faiths, resulting in a spectrum of opinions about how religious cosmology and the Big Bang theory truly support one another.

== Background ==
The Big Bang itself is a scientific theory, and as such, stands or falls by its agreement with observations. However, as a theory which addresses the nature of the universe since its earliest discernible existence, the Big Bang carries possible theological implications regarding the concept of creation out of nothing. Many atheist philosophers have argued against the idea of the Universe having a beginning – the universe might simply have existed for all eternity, but with the emerging evidence of the Big Bang theory, both physicists and theistic philosophers have viewed it as capable of being explained by theism; a popular philosophical argument for the existence of God known as the Kalam cosmological argument rests in the concepts of the Big Bang. In the 1920s and 1930s, almost every major cosmologist preferred an eternal steady state universe, and several complained that the beginning of time implied by the Big Bang imported religious concepts into physics; this objection was later repeated by supporters of the steady-state theory, who rejected the implication that the universe had a beginning.

== Hinduism ==
The view from the Hindu Puranas is that of an eternal universe cosmology in which time has no absolute beginning, but rather is infinite and cyclic, as opposed to a universe which originated from a Big Bang. However, the Encyclopædia of Hinduism, referencing Katha Upanishad 2:20, states that the Big Bang theory reminds humanity that everything came from the Brahman which is "subtler than the atom, greater than the greatest." It consists of several "Big Bangs" and "Big Crunches" following each other in a cyclical manner.

The Nasadiya Sukta, the Hymn of Creation in the Rigveda (10:129), mentions the world beginning from nothing through the power of heat. This can be seen as corresponding to the Big Bang theory.

THEN was not non-existent nor existent: there was no realm of air, no sky beyond it. What covered in, and where? and what gave shelter? Was water there, unfathomed depth of water?

— Rig Veda X.129.1

Death was not then, nor was there aught immortal: no sign was there, the day's and night's divider. That One Thing, breathless, breathed by its own nature: apart from it was nothing whatsoever

— Rig Veda X.129.2

Several prominent modern scientists have remarked that Hinduism (and also Buddhism and Jainism by extension as all three faiths share most of these philosophies) is the only religion (or civilization) in all of recorded history, that has timescales and theories in astronomy (cosmology), that appear to correspond to those of modern scientific cosmology, e.g. Carl Sagan, Niels Bohr, Erwin Schrödinger, Werner Heisenberg, Robert Oppenheimer, George Sudarshan, Fritjof Capra etc. Sir Roger Penrose is among the present-day physicists that believe in a cyclical model for the Universe, wherein there are alternating cycles consisting of Big Bangs and Big Crunches, and he describes this model to be "a bit more like Hindu philosophy" as compared to the Abrahamic faiths.

== Christianity ==
Similarly to creatio ex nihilo, the Genesis creation narrative opens with the Hebrew phrase bereshit bara elohim et hashamayim ve'et ha'aretz, which can be interpreted in at least three ways:

1. As a statement that the cosmos had an absolute beginning (In the beginning, God created the heavens and earth).
2. As a statement describing the condition of the world when God began creating (When in the beginning God created the heavens and the earth, the earth was untamed and shapeless).
3. As background information (When in the beginning God created the heavens and the earth, the earth being untamed and shapeless, God said, Let there be light!).

Though option 1 has been the historic and predominant view, it has been suggested since the Middle Ages that it cannot be the preferred translation based on strictly linguistic and exegetical grounds. Whereas our modern societies see the origin of matter as a question of crucial importance, this may not have been the case for ancient cultures. Some scholars assert that when the author(s) of Genesis wrote the creation account, they were more concerned with God bringing the cosmos into operation by assigning roles and functions.

The Big Bang theory was partly developed by a Catholic priest, Georges Lemaître, who believed that there was neither a connection nor a conflict between his religion and his science. At the November 22, 1951, opening meeting of the Pontifical Academy of Sciences, Pope Pius XII declared that the Big Bang theory does not conflict with the Catholic concept of creation. Some Conservative Protestant Christian denominations have also welcomed the Big Bang theory as supporting a historical interpretation of the doctrine of creation; however, adherents of Young Earth creationism, who advocate a very literal interpretation of the Book of Genesis, tend to reject the theory.

== Bakongo Spirituality ==
In Kongo spiritual tradition, the Bakongo people of the Congo River basin believe that in the beginning there was only a circular void, which they refer to as Mbungi. The Supreme god Nzambi (female counterpart: Nzambici) then summoned a spark of fire, called Kalûnga, which filled the void and burned and grew and hardened. The heat created so much energy that pieces of burning mbungi were cast far and wide. When the fires eventually burned out, the hardened pieces cooled and became planets, forming the universe. They also believe that the earth underwent four stages of creation that included: the emergence of fire, the burning, the cooling, and the emergence of life. Philosopher Molefi Kete Asante and theologist Kiatezua Lubanzadio Luyaluka both cited these similarities that they believe show a compatibility between Bakongo cosmology and the Big Bang theory.

== Baháʼí Faith ==
Bahá'u'lláh, the founder of the Baháʼí Faith, has taught that the universe has "neither beginning nor ending". In the Tablet of Wisdom ("Lawh-i-Hikmat", written 1873–1874). Bahá'u'lláh states: "That which hath been in existence had existed before, but not in the form thou seest today. The world of existence came into being through the heat generated from the interaction between the active force and that which is its recipient. These two are the same, yet they are different." The terminology used here refers to ancient Greek and Islamic philosophy (al-Kindi, Avicenna, Fakhr al-Din al-Razi and Shaykh Ahmad). In an early text, Bahá'u'lláh describes the successive creation of the four natures heat and cold (the active force), dryness and moisture (the recipients), and the four elements fire, air, water and earth. About the phrase "That which hath been in existence had existed before, but not in the form thou seest today," 'Abdu'l-Bahá has stated that it means that the universe is evolving. He also states that "the substance and primary matter of contingent beings is the ethereal power, which is invisible and only known through its effects... Ethereal matter is itself both the active force and the recipient... it is the sign of the Primal Will in the phenomenal world... The ethereal matter is, therefore, the cause, since light, heat, and electricity appear from it. It is also the effect, for as vibrations take place in it, they become visible...".

Jean-Marc Lepain, Robin Mihrshahi, Dale E. Lehman and Julio Savi suggest a possible relation of this statement with the Big Bang theory.

== Islam ==
Writing for the Kyoto Bulletin of Islamic Area Studies, Haslin Hasan and Ab. Hafiz Mat Tuah wrote that modern scientific ideas on cosmology are creating new ideas on how to interpret the Quran's cosmogonical terms. In particular, some modern-day Muslim groups have advocated for interpreting the term al-sama, traditionally believed to be a reference to both the sky and the seven heavens, as instead referring to the universe as a whole.

Mirza Tahir Ahmad, head of the Ahmadiyya community, asserted in his book Revelation, Rationality, Knowledge & Truth that the Big Bang theory was foretold in the Quran. He referenced the verse 30 of the Sūrat al-Anbiyāʼ, which says that the heavens and the earth were a joined entity:

Have those who disbelieved not considered that the heavens and the earth were a joined entity, and We separated them and made from water every living thing? Then will they not believe?

— Quran 21:30

This view that the Qu'ran references the initial singularity of the Big Bang is also accepted by many Muslim scholars outside of the Ahmadiyya community such as Muhammad Tahir-ul-Qadri, who is a Sufi scholar, and Muhammad Asad, who was a nondenominational Muslim scholar. Further, some scholars such as Faheem Ashraf of the Islamic Research Foundation International, Inc. and Sheikh Omar Suleiman of the Yaqeen Institute for Islamic Research argue that the scientific theory of an expanding universe is described in Sūrat adh-Dhāriyāt:

And the heaven We constructed with strength, and indeed, We are [its] expander.

— Quran 51:47

However, not all Muslim scholars agree that the Qu'ran supports the Big Bang theory. Using a different interpretation of the Qur'an 21:30, physicist Abdul Mabud asserts that there was no gap between Earth's joint separation from the heavens and Earth's subsequent formation. Therefore, Mabud rejects the notion that Earth was formed from cosmic dust which spawned from the Big Bang.

== Judaism ==
"That the universe had a definite starting point" was addressed in a 2014 article with the title "New Big Bang evidence supports Biblical creation, says Orthodox physicist." Harvard's John Kovac called it a "smoking-gun signature."

BBC asked and answered "Is the Big Bang theory compatible with Judaism." Chabad/Lubavitch's website writes that it is science that caught up to the Torah's teachings regarding what today is called the Big Bang.

A Jewish doctor named David W. Weiss believes that the Big Bang theory is compatible with traditional Jewish cosmology given that repeatable experiments cannot be applied to materials far out of reach. Therefore, Weiss believes that a true scientist should be of the belief that a Creator was responsible for the Big Bang.
