= Cutting Through Spiritual Materialism =

Book by Chögyam Trungpa

- Author: Chögyam Trungpa
- Language: English
- Genre: Tibetan Buddhism
- Publisher: Shambhala Publications
- Publication date: 1973 (1st ed.)
- Publication place: United States
- Media type: Print (Paperback)
- Pages: 227 pp (first edition)
- ISBN: 978-0-87773-050-7

Cutting Through Spiritual Materialism, by Chögyam Trungpa is a book addressing many common pitfalls of self-deception in seeking spirituality, which the author describes as Spiritual materialism. It is the transcript of two series of lectures given by Trungpa Rinpoche in 1970–71.

In Psychology Today Michael J. Formica writes,

As soon as we cast something into a role, as soon as we put a label on it, as soon as we name it and give it life by virtue of our investment (read: ego), we take away all its power and it is nothing more than an event – it is no longer a spiritual revelation, but simply a material experience. This is spiritual materialism at its peak.
