= Contemplative psychology =

Contemplative psychology "is a psychology that forms an intrinsic part of the contemplative traditions of most world religions. The term 'contemplative psychology' therefore does not refer to academic psychological theory about contemplation, religion or religious behavior. It refers to the psychological insights and methods that are - often implicitly - present in the vision and practice of religions and that clarify and guide ones contemplative or religious development" (p. 82). "Contemplative psychology addresses the question of how we could intelligently approach and understand human life-experience" (p. 83).

== Background ==
The term Contemplative Psychology was coined by Han F. De Wit in 1991 when he, a theoretical psychologist at Vrije Universiteit in Amsterdam, published his pioneering book Contemplative Psychology. The goal of this project was to "establish a dialogue between contemplative psychology and academic psychology" (p. 233). As a first step Han did not offer a systematic contemplative psychology but rather he suggested a "framework in which a full-fledged contemplative psychology may be developed" (p. 3). In this work he outlines the "contours and the view of contemplative psychology" (p. 4). As Han develops the concept, his first point is to illustrate "a position from which the 'excavation' and 'exposure' of the contemplative psychologies seems possible" (p. 115) and to "make explicit and clarify the nature and position of the psychological know-how that contemplative traditions contain" (p. 14) This implied a comparative study of different religious and contemplative traditions in the belief that there was enough in common between these traditions to make "the search for a general contemplative psychological perspective and approach" meaningful (p. 4).

Contemplative psychology became visible in the Western sphere of psychology when researchers began studying the methods used to help individuals understand their own mind, emotions, and motivations. The goal of these practices is to improve the quality of one's own life (and, by extension, the quality of other people's lives). Research began at Naropa University, and was developed extensively by Han himself.

Thus far, mindfulness has been the contemplative practice of most research. Mindfulness is a practice that allows one to exist in the present moment without being judgmental of it. This meditative absorption, often referred to as samadhi in many eastern traditions, is the equivalent of contemplation in Western traditions. Gerald G. May expands on this notion in his book Will and Spirit by differentiating between willfulness and willingness. Willfulness, he explains, is one's attempted mastery over the psyche, while willingness is a surrender of one's self to a way of being. Contemplative practices allow persons to cultivate meaningful experiences intrinsic to religious and spiritual traditions that are virtually absent in modern, mechanistic psychology alone.

=== Understanding contemplative traditions ===
For Han, the project of defining a contemplative psychology begins with the excavation and explication of the "psychology embedded in various contemplative traditions (although often in an implicit and not fully developed state); to compare these different psychologies and derive more general rules from them; and to refine and systematize these findings further through a confrontation with contemporary academic psychology" (p. 84). Thus Han did not create the concept of contemplative psychology from scratch. It emerged as a common techne in various religious and secular traditions.

Han develops three concepts of contemplative tradition: monastic tradition, lay tradition and temporal (non-religious) tradition. Monastic tradition is "a context in which people devote their whole life to the practice of a religious discipline and to the spiritual exercises that are part of it" (p. 84). People of the monastic traditions typically live with a group of individuals that is fairly separate from the surrounding society. "Their daily life activities are permeated by a discipline that is supposed to develop and sustain religious or spiritual growth" (p. 84). These individuals are typically trained to possess a practical knowledge of their particular tradition and there role is to educate people in the religious view of the world. "This know how is psychological and methodological in nature" (p. 84). It is a form of contemplative psychology.

Lay traditions are "religious disciplines that are practiced in the context of normal every day life" (p. 84). There are two particular views on lay tradition practice. One is that religious practice in everyday life brings one closer to a monastic tradition and the other is that daily life is the ultimate monastery and that daily practice is the monastic practice brought into everyday lived experiences. In either view there is psychological knowledge that could be considered contemplative.

Temporal (non-religious) traditions are "contemplative traditions could be 'non religious', that is without a connection with a particular religion" (p. 84). Despite an informal nature these traditions contain "a discipline based on a particular kind of psychological knowledge, that guides its practitioners towards the realization of the highest human values" (p. 84).

The assumption of contemplative psychology is that contemplative traditions have in common "some normative anthropology, some notion of 'materialistic man' or 'fallen man' and the idea that human beings have the possibility to uplift themselves and others from their' corrupted state' towards what is often called 'enlightenment'"(p. 84). Contemplative psychology gathers its knowledge base from the comparative analysis of experiential knowledge across contemplative traditions.

== Differences from the psychology of religion and psychology in general ==
"If we would interpret the preposition ‘of’ in the possessive sense of 'belonging to', then contemplative psychology would definitely be a psychology of religion, but the academic ‘psychology of religion’ would not. For the standard interpretation of the preposition ‘of' in ‘psychology of religion’ is rather in the direction of ‘about’ than in the direction of ‘belonging to’. And conventional psychology about religion is not and does not intend to be a psychology belonging to religion" (p.86).

Thus contemplative psychology is a psychology of first-person experience. The psychology of religion (and scientific psychology) is a psychology about its object of study, it is a third-person psychology. The major difference is epistemological. The first-person nature of contemplative psychology values the knowledge which comes from private, personal experience. "It has its own notion of objectivity (see e.g. the ‘acid test of truth’ in Roberts, 1985: 171)" (p.86). The psychology of religion and scientific psychology in general "tend to shun away from research into experience that is only available in the first-person sense. For the private character of first-person experience seems to exclude ‘objectivity’ as defined in third person methodology" (p. 86).

=== Differing objectives ===
"The object of contemplative psychology is the totality of human existence or human experience. The central question is: what is the place of all aspects of human life within the contemplative perspective and its development? How could one deal with all these aspects in a way that furthers one’s contemplative development" (p.87)?

"The object of scientific psychology of religion is religion itself, which is viewed as one among the many non-religious aspects of human life. The central question here is: how could we gain a third-person psychological understanding of religious phenomena and how are these causally related to other non-religious phenomena" (p.87)?

=== Differing aims ===
The aim of contemplative psychology as a field of study is a way of life. It pursues knowledge about living "in the first-person sense of being wise [and] being free from confusion and ignorance" (p. 87).

The aim of psychology of religion is scientific knowledge, that is true information about its object of study. "This knowledge is primarily representational and indirect and as such distinct from (at a distance of) what it represents"(p. 87).

=== Differing methodology ===
Because of the difference in epistemological bases there is also differentiation between the methods of acquiring the differing types of knowledge. The methods of contemplative psychologies are in fact practices and disciplines like (meditation, contemplation, prayer) that bring about what the contemplative tradition views the existentential path towards the above-mentioned aims." Han de Wit characterizes these practices as awareness strategies that are aimed at the "discipline of becoming aware on the spot of one’s working basis" (p. 111). The methods of psychology of religion consist of the empirical scientific method, which are characterized by Han de Wit as conceptual strategies, as they aim for the development of conceptual knowledge that represents human behavior."

== Uses ==
An example of using contemplative psychology would be using Buddhist concepts such as no self (anatta), equanimity, karma, impermanence, brilliant sanity (or buddha-nature), ego, mindfulness, and interconnectedness as framework for interpreting psychological experiences, as is done in the contemplative counseling program at Naropa university. The same could be applied to other faiths, as May used the Christian concept of Grace as a framework for explaining our psychological surrender to a cosmic order.
