= Tominaga Nakamoto =

Japanese philosopher

Tominaga Nakamoto (富永 仲基, Tominaga Nakamoto; 1715–1746) was a Japanese philosopher. He was educated at the Kaitokudō academy founded by members of the mercantile class of Osaka, but was ostracised shortly after the age of 15. Tominaga belonged to a Japanese rationalist school of thought and advocated a Japanese variation of atheism, mukishinron (no gods or demons). He was also a merchant in Osaka. Only a few of his works survive; his Setsuhei ("Discussions on Error") has been lost and may have been the reason for his separation from the Kaitokudō, and around nine other works' titles are known. The surviving works are his Okina no Fumi ("The Writings of an Old Man"), Shutsujō Gogo ("Words after Enlightenment"; on textual criticism of Buddhist sutras), and three other works on ancient musical scales, ancient measurements, and poetry.

He took a deep critical stance against normative systems of thought, partially based on the Kaitokudō's emphasis on objectivity, but was clearly heterodox in eschewing the dominant philosophies of the institution. He was critical of Buddhism, Confucianism and Shinto. Whereas each of these traditions drew on history as a source of authority, Tominaga saw appeals to history as a pseudo-justification for innovations that try to outdo other sects vying for power. For example, he cited the various Confucian Masters who saw human nature as partially good, neither good nor bad, all good, and inherently bad; analysing later interpreters who tried to incorporate and reconcile all Masters. He criticised Shinto as obscurantist, especially in its habit of secret instruction. As he always said, "hiding is the beginning of lying and stealing".

In his study of Buddhist scriptures, he asserted that Hinayana school of scriptures preceded Mahayana scriptures but also asserted that the vast majority of Hinayana scriptures are also composed much later than the life of Gautama Buddha, the position which was later supported by modern scriptural studies. His work represents an early and indigenous example of Buddhist studies and reflects awareness of Manichaeism and its possible relationship with Buddhism. While Michael Pye has argued that Tominaga represents a non-European example of religious studies, this view has been challenged by Jason Josephson, who argues that Tominaga does not treat non-Buddhist traditions as systematic religions.

== Bibliography ==
- Lai, Whalen (1982). "The Search for the Historical Śākyamuni in Light of the Historical Jesus" (PDF). Buddhist-Christian Studies. 2. University of Hawai'i Press: 77–91. doi:10.2307/1390076. JSTOR 1390076.
- Barrett, T. (1993). "Tominaga Our Contemporary" (PDF). Journal of the Royal Asiatic Society. Third Series. 3 (2). Cambridge University Press on behalf of the Royal Asiatic Society of Great Britain and Ireland: 245–252. doi:10.1017/S1356186300004314. S2CID 163008961.
- Faure, Bernard (1998). "Clerical Vices and Vicissitudes" (PDF). The Red Thread. Princeton University Press.
- Pye, Michael (2003). "Modern Japan and the Science of Religions" (PDF). Method & Theory in the Study of Religion. 15 (1). Brill: 1–27. doi:10.1163/15700680360549394.
- Brecher, W. (2013). "Strange Thoughts: A Confluence of Intellectual Heterodoxies" (PDF). The Aesthetics of Strangeness: Eccentricity and Madness in Early Modern Japan. University of Hawai'i Press.
