= The Universe in a Single Atom =

2005 book by Tenzin Gyatso

- First edition
- Author: Dalai Lama
- Original title: The Universe in A Single Atom
- Language: English
- Genre: Buddhism
- Publisher: Morgan Road Books
- Publication date: 2005
- Pages: 216
- ISBN: 978-0-7679-2081-0

The Universe in a Single Atom is a book by Tenzin Gyatso, the 14th Dalai Lama and published in 2005 by Morgan Road Books. In this book Dalai Lama engages in several scientific areas. He explores the topics of quantum physics, cosmology, consciousness and genetics in relation to Buddhism.

== Rationale ==
Tenzin Gyatso, at the age of 6, was chosen as the 14th Dalai Lama. He is believed to be the reincarnation of his predecessors. At an early age, Gyatso showed interest in science and the scientific method. In this book, "The Universe in a Single Atom", Tenzin Gyatso explores the commonality and difference between Buddhism and scientific argumentation.

=== Beginnings in science ===
In this book, The Universe in a Single Atom, The Dalai Lama exhibits humble beginnings in science, including finding a brass telescope from the thirteenth Dalai Lama. With the telescope, he was able to find "the rabbit on the moon," a Tibetan saying for a landform on the Moon. Utilizing other apparatuses such as cars and watches, the Dalai Lama took interest in the mechanical operations of the objects.

=== Commonality between Buddhism and science ===
In the book, The Dalai Lama creates exigency for the peaceful relationship between Buddhism and science. The goal is to mitigate human suffering from both Buddhist philosophy and science. Scientists and Buddhists acknowledge that Buddhists use sensory perceptions and introspective thinking requiring cooperation of the body. In the 1980s, The Dalai Lama sought scientific advice from Francisco Varela. A product of the meeting was Varela's realization that the act of meditation through introspective thinking could complement science.

=== Quantum Physics and Buddhism ===
Buddhist teachings prove everything is changing and transitory. Essentially, thoughts come into a mind, then move on. Buddhists believe this is what causes suffering. The Dalai Lama believes in justifying the concept of micro-matter through the definition of inconsistent flow. The nature of a paradoxical reality mirrors the Buddhist philosophy of emptiness. Quantum physics debates the sustainability of having the notion of reality, as defined by Buddhist philosophy.

=== Cosmology and Buddhism ===
One way Buddhists and scientists agree is their understanding of the Buddha's lack of explanation for the formation of the universe. However, Buddhist cosmologists have created the notion of a universe that has a form, expands, and then is destructive. Both sides, science, and Buddhist cosmologists, do not immediately resort to creating a Godly being as the origin of all matter. Moreover, in Buddhism, the universe is depicted as infinite and beginningless. The Dalai Lama wishes, in the book, to venture beyond the Big Bang and process thoughts about the possible structures and activity before the Big Bang.

=== Consciousness and Buddhism ===
According to Dr. Hugh Murdoch of The Theosophical Society Australia, the concept of consciousness has been insignificantly proven through scientific study. The Dalai Lama asks the question for scientists, what about the direct observation of consciousness itself? The concept of consciousness was discussed by the Buddha who said the mind is paramount above all things. Buddhists believe in the concept of matter, mind, and mental states. The Dalai Lama wishes for scientists to quit questioning if consciousness is favored in dualism, or materialism and study through the first-person perspective.

=== Genetics and Buddhism ===
Buddhists believe the primary purpose of life is to eliminate suffering. The Dalai Lama has no objection to cloning, only if it is based on altruistic motivation. The Dalai Lama supports the Human Genome Project because it shows the difference between different ethnicities is minimal at best.

== Critical reception ==
After closely analyzing The Universe in a Single Atom, Michael Shermer, publisher of Skeptic Magazine, concludes, "So I would caution both Christians and Buddhists alike: be careful what you wish for in this endeavor to unify science and religion-you may not like what you find." Arthur Zajonc, president of the Mind and Life Institute states, "The Universe in a Single Atom is an open-minded engagement between intellectual traditions, an engagement that enriches our shrinking planet." Critic Lisa Liquori states, "Though the Dalai Lama aims to reach a wide audience and offers a fair, nicely written, and thoughtful treatise, the subject matter will primarily appeal to spiritual types and to altruistic, ethical physicists and biologists.
