= How the Hippies Saved Physics =

2011 non-fiction book by David Kaiser

How the Hippies Saved Physics: Science, Counterculture, and the Quantum Revival
- Author: David Kaiser
- Genre: Nonfiction
- Publisher: W.W. Norton & Company
- Publication date: 2011
- ISBN: 9780393082302

How the Hippies Saved Physics: Science, Counterculture, and the Quantum Revival is a 2011 book by physicist David Kaiser. The book received the Davis Prize from the History of Science Society in 2013 and was Physics World's 2012 Book of the Year.

== Summary ==
In the book's introduction, Kaiser explains that the title is a facetious comparison to How the Irish Saved Civilization because of the parallel situations: both describing "an unlikely group of underdogs and castaways" nurturing knowledge during a period of decay.

Kaiser describes how the early philosophical approach to physics was replaced by pragmatic results-oriented studies during World War II and the Cold War. Funding was directed to research that would contribute to government and defense efforts. Inquiries into the possibilities opened up by quantum physics were discouraged in academia and professional journals. With the end of the Cold War, the generous funds for physics research went away. The field of physics was reliant on federal funding. As funding dried up, college enrollments in physics dropped and jobs disappeared. By 1971, the Placement Service of the American Institute of Physics registered 1053 applicants for only 53 jobs.

Enter the Fundamental Fysiks Group, founded in San Francisco in May 1975 by two physicists, Elizabeth Rauscher and George Weissmann, at the time both graduate students at the University of California, Berkeley. The group held informal discussions on Friday afternoons to explore the philosophical implications of quantum theory. Leading members included Fritjof Capra, John Clauser, Philippe Eberhard, Nick Herbert, Jack Sarfatti, Saul-Paul Sirag, Henry Stapp, and Fred Alan Wolf. Kaiser argues that the group's meetings and papers helped to nurture the ideas in quantum physics that came to form the basis of quantum information science.

Kaiser argues that the Fundamental Fysiks Group saved physics by exploring these ideas, in three ways:

They self-consciously opened up space again ... for the kind of spirited philosophical engagement with fundamental physics that the Cold War decades had dampened. More than most of their generation, they sought to recapture the big-picture search for meaning that had driven their heroes—Einstein, Bohr, Heisenberg, and Schrödinger—and to smuggle that mode of doing physics back into their daily routine.

Second, members of the Fundamental Fysiks Group latched onto a topic, known as "Bell's theorem," and rescued it from a decade of unrelenting obscurity. The theorem ... stipulated that quantum objects that had once interacted would retain some strange link or connection, even after they had moved arbitrarily far apart from each other. ... Working in various genres and media, the Fundamental Fysiks Group grappled with Bell's theorem and quantum entanglement. ... In the process, they forced a few of their physicist peers to pay attention to the topic ... From these battles, quantum information science was born.

The hippie physicists' concerted push on Bell's theorem and quantum entanglement instigated major breakthroughs ... The most important became known as the "no-cloning theorem", a new insight into quantum theory that emerged from spirited efforts to wrestle with hypothetical machines dreamed up by members of the Fundamental Fysiks Group.

Much like scientists in the earlier part of the century, physicists began to seek out patronage to fund their research: private donors, philanthropical foundations, and local industries. Their patrons included Arthur M. Young from the Institute for the Study of Consciousness in Berkeley; toy manufacture Henry Dakin, who was interested in the paranormal; Werner Erhard, founder of Erhard Seminars Training (est); and entrepreneur and filmmaker George Koopman. Their discussion groups, forums, and workshops (particularly at the Esalen Institute, where they became a regular feature) were settings in which physicists could explore the implications of quantum theory

The mainstream journal Physical Review refused articles on the interpretation of quantum mechanics. While some physicists published in the Italian journal Nuovo Cimento and the new journal Foundations of Physics, many of their papers and articles were circulated in the hand-typed newsletter Epistemological Letters or were photocopied and distributed by mail by Ira Einhorn in an early form of a preprint network.

Members of the Fundamental Fysiks Group published popular science books, such as The Tao of Physics, The Dancing Wu Li Masters, and Space-Time and Beyond. By working through speculations about faster-than-light communication generated by the Fundamental Fysiks Group, physicists were able to establish principles of physics to argue why it cannot work, such as the no-signaling principle.

== Reception ==
George Johnson wrote in his review for the New York Times that he enjoyed the book, but was not persuaded that the influence of the "hippies" in the book was as significant as the book portrayed.

Two reviewers wrote that Kaiser may have exaggerated the group's influence on the future of physics research, though one of them, Silvan Schweber, wrote that some of the group's contributions are easy to identify, such as Clauser's experimental evidence for non-locality attracting a share of the Wolf Prize in 2010, and the publication of Capra's The Tao of Physics (1975) and Gary Zukav's The Dancing Wu Li Masters (1979) attracting the interest of a wider audience.

In a review of Kaiser's book in Physics Today, Schweber challenges Kaiser's views of the importance of the Fundamental Fysiks Group. He writes that Bell's Theorem was not obscure during the preceding decade, but was worked on by authors such as John Clauser (who was a member of the group) and Eugene Wigner. Schweber also mentioned the work of Alain Aspect, which preceded Nick Herbert's 1981 proposal.

A review in Historical Studies in the Natural Sciences notes that although the book is not convincing that quantum theory would not have advanced as it has without the influence of the Fundamental Fysics Group and its fellow travellers, it does make "a compelling case for treating extra-scientific ideas, people, and events as generators of scientific excitement and curiosity".

How the Hippies Saved Physics was also reviewed in Nova Religio, Social Studies of Science, American Scientist, Science, and Nature.
