= Elizabeth Rauscher =

American physicist and parapsychologist (1937–2019)

- Born: 18 March 1937; Berkeley, California, U.S.
- Died: 3 July 2019 (aged 82)
- Education: BS (chemistry and physics); MS (nuclear physics) 1965; PhD (nuclear physics) 1978
- Alma mater: University of California, Berkeley
- Occupations: Physicist, Parapsychologist
- Known for: Co-founded the Berkeley Fundamental Fysiks Group
- Spouse: William van Bise

Elizabeth A. Rauscher (March 18, 1937 – July 3, 2019) was an American physicist and parapsychologist.

She was a former researcher with the Lawrence Berkeley National Laboratory, Lawrence Livermore National Laboratory, the Stanford Research Institute, and NASA.

In 1975 Rauscher co-founded the Berkeley Fundamental Fysiks Group, an informal group of physicists who met weekly to discuss quantum mysticism and the philosophy of quantum physics. David Kaiser argued in his book, How the Hippies Saved Physics that this group helped to nurture ideas which were unpopular at the time within the physics community, but which later, in part, formed the basis of quantum information science.

Rauscher had an interest in psychic healing and faith healing and other paranormal claims.

== Early life, education and career ==
Rauscher was born in Berkeley, California on March 18, 1937.

In How the Hippies Saved Physics (2011), Kaiser writes that Rauscher had always been interested in science, and as a child had designed and built her own telescopes. Raised near Berkeley, she started hanging around the Lawrence Berkeley Laboratory when she was in high school. She enrolled at Berkeley for her first degree, and published her first article, on nuclear fusion, while still an undergraduate. Kaiser writes that she was the only woman in her class; at that time women in America earned only five and two percent of physics undergraduate degrees and PhDs respectively. He writes that she coped with it by wearing tweedy dresses and keeping her hair short, though she experienced some intimidation. She obtained her master's in nuclear physics in 1965. From 1975 to 1978, she was a researcher at the Stanford Research Institute's Radio Physics Laboratory.

She married and had a son, and when she became their sole provider took a job as a staff scientist at the Lawrence Livermore National Laboratory. When her son was old enough, she returned to Berkeley to begin her PhD under Glenn Seaborg, the nuclear chemist. She continued by working at Lawrence Berkeley National Laboratory (LBNL) and additionally started and chaired the Livermore Philosophy Group, offering classes on the relationship between science and society at Berkeley, and later at the Stanford Linear Accelerator Center. She completed her PhD in 1978 on "Coupled Channel Alpha Decay Theory for Even and Odd-Mass Light and Heavy Nuclei."

She later held positions as professor of physics and general science at John F. Kennedy University, 1978–1984; research consultant to NASA, 1983–1985; and professor and graduate student adviser in the department of physics at the University of Nevada, Reno, 1990–1998.

== Fundamental Fysiks Group ==
External image
- Members of the Fundamental Fysiks Group, featured in Francis Ford Coppola's City Magazine in 1975. Left to right: Jack Sarfatti, Saul-Paul Sirag, Nick Herbert, and (seated) Fred Alan Wolf.

At Berkeley in May 1975, she and George Weissmann co-founded the Fundamental Fysiks Group, an informal group of physicists who met for Friday afternoon brainstorming sessions to explore the philosophical problems posed by quantum physics, particularly the relationship between physics and consciousness. She named and chaired this group. The group included Fritjof Capra, John Clauser, Nick Herbert, Jack Sarfatti, Henry Stapp, and Fred Alan Wolf. According to Kaiser, Rauscher and Weissman started the meetings in a fit of pique and frustration, saddened by the absence of a philosophical perspective in their physics classes.

== Parapsychology ==
Rauscher had an interest in psychic healing and faith healing.

Kaiser describes how Rauscher's personal interests within the group lay with remote viewing, precognition, psychokinesis, remote healing, and ghosts. Jeffrey John Kripal writes that Rauscher broadened the group to include non-physicists, and in the late 1970s and early 1980s the group's members met annually at the Esalen Institute to continue their exchange of ideas, exerting a major influence on alternative religious thought in the United States.

== Later research ==
Starting in the early 1980s with her husband—William van Bise, an engineer—she researched the effects of electromagnetic fields on biological systems to enhance health. In the 1990s, Rauscher and van Bise, moved to an estate in Devotion, North Carolina, owned by Richard J. Reynolds III, grandson of R. J. Reynolds, the tobacco magnate. Until his death in 1994, Reynolds allowed them to live there to conduct research into the effects of electromagnetic fields on brain waves. A third scientist, physician Andrija Puharich, had been living and conducting research on the estate since 1980. After Reynolds' death, the scientists said he had invited them to remain there as long as they wanted, but they were unable to produce a written agreement.

== Death ==
Rauscher died on July 3, 2019, aged 82.

== Selected works ==
- Amoroso, Richard L. and Elizabeth A. Rauscher. "Complex Dimensional Geometries and Measurement". Unified Theories. Eds. Richard L. Amoroso, István Dienes, and Csaba Varga. Palo Alto: Noetic Press (2008). ISBN 978-0-9678687-7-6
- Amoroso, Richard L. and Elizabeth A. Rauscher. The Holographic Anthropic Multiverse: Formalizing the Complex Geometry of Reality. Hackensack: World Scientific (2009). ISBN 978-981-283-930-5
- Amoroso, Richard L. and Elizabeth A. Rauscher. "The Physical Implications of Multidimensional Geometries and Measurement". International Journal of Computing Anticipatory Systems. 2006.
- Dea, Y. Jack, Wolfgang-M. Boerner, Elizabeth A. Rauscher and William Van Bise. "Observations of ELF (extremely low frequency) signatures arising from space vehicle disturbances of the ionosphere". Canadian Journal of Physics. 69.8–9 (1991): 91–151.
- Haramein, N. and Rauscher, E.A. "The origin of spin: A consideration of torque and coriolis forces in Einstein’s field equations and Grand Unification Theory", in R. L. Amoroso, B. Lehnert & J-P Vigier (eds.) Beyond The Standard Model: Searching For Unity In Physics. The Noetic Press. 2005, pp. 153–168.
- Rauscher, Elizabeth A. "Electron interactions and quantum plasma physics." Journal of Plasma Physics. 2. (1968): 517–541.
- Rauscher, Elizabeth A. Electromagnetic Phenomena in Complex Geometries and Nonlinear Phenomena, Non-Hertzian Waves and Magnetic Monopoles. Breckenridge: Tesla Book Company (1983). ISBN 0-9603536-9-0
- Rauscher, Elizabeth A. "Foreword". Electrogravitics systems: reports on a new propulsion methodology. Ed. Thomas Valone. Beltsville: Integrity Research Institute (1994). ISBN 0-9641070-0-7
- Rauscher, Elizabeth A. "Psychokinetic interaction with laboratory prepared materials: A prototype experimental design." PSI Research. 3.3–4 (1984): 26–41.
- Rauscher, Elizabeth A., James Hurtak and D.E. Hurtak Universal Scaling Laws in Quantum Theory and Cosmology.(2012).
- Rauscher, Elizabeth A. and Richard L. Amoroso. Orbiting the Moons of Pluto: Complex Solutions to the Einstein, Maxwell, Schrödinger and Dirac Equations. Hackensack: World Scientific (2011). ISBN 978-981-4324-24-3
