= Fundamental Fysiks Group =

Quantum mysticism organization

External image
- The Fundamental Fysiks Group, City Magazine, 1975. Left to right: Jack Sarfatti, Saul-Paul Sirag, Nick Herbert, and Fred Alan Wolf (seated)

The Fundamental Fysiks Group was founded in San Francisco in May 1975 by two physicists, Elizabeth Rauscher and George Weissmann, at the time both graduate students at the University of California, Berkeley. The group held informal discussions on Friday afternoons to explore the philosophical implications of quantum theory. Leading members included Fritjof Capra, John Clauser, Philippe Eberhard, Nick Herbert, Jack Sarfatti, Saul-Paul Sirag, Henry Stapp, and Fred Alan Wolf.

David Kaiser argues, in How the Hippies Saved Physics: Science, Counterculture, and the Quantum Revival (2011), that the group's meetings and papers helped to nurture the ideas in quantum physics that came to form the basis of quantum information science. Two reviewers wrote that Kaiser may have exaggerated the group's influence on the future of physics research, though one of them, Silvan Schweber, wrote that some of the group's contributions are easy to identify, such as Clauser's experimental evidence for non-locality attracting a share of the Wolf Prize in 2010, and the publication of Capra's The Tao of Physics (1975) and Gary Zukav's The Dancing Wu Li Masters (1979) attracting the interest of a wider audience.

Kaiser writes that the group were "very smart and very playful", discussing quantum mysticism and becoming local celebrities in the Bay Area's counterculture. When Francis Ford Coppola bought City Magazine in 1975, one of its earliest features was on the Fundamental Fysiks Group, including a photo spread of Sirag, Wolf, Herbert, and Sarfatti.

== Research ==
=== Bell's theorem and no-cloning theorem ===
Hugh Gusterson writes that several challenging ideas lie at the heart of quantum physics: that electrons behave like waves and particles; that you can know a particle's location or momentum, but not both; that observing a particle changes its behavior; and that particles appear to communicate with each other across great distances, known as nonlocality and quantum entanglement. It is these concepts that led to the development of quantum information science and quantum encryption, which has been experimentally used, for example, to transfer money and electronic votes. Kaiser argues that the Fundamental Fysiks Group saved physics by exploring these ideas, in three ways:

They self-consciously opened up space again ... for the kind of spirited philosophical engagement with fundamental physics that the Cold War decades had dampened. More than most of their generation, they sought to recapture the big-picture search for meaning that had driven their heroes—Einstein, Bohr, Heisenberg, and Schrödinger—and to smuggle that mode of doing physics back into their daily routine.

Second, members of the Fundamental Fysiks Group latched onto a topic, known as "Bell's theorem," and rescued it from a decade of unrelenting obscurity. The theorem ... stipulated that quantum objects that had once interacted would retain some strange link or connection, even after they had moved arbitrarily far apart from each other. ... Working in various genres and media, the Fundamental Fysiks Group grappled with Bell's theorem and quantum entanglement. ... In the process, they forced a few of their physicist peers to pay attention to the topic ... From these battles, quantum information science was born.

The hippie physicists' concerted push on Bell's theorem and quantum entanglement instigated major breakthroughs ... The most important became known as the "no-cloning theorem," a new insight into quantum theory that emerged from spirited efforts to wrestle with hypothetical machines dreamed up by members of the Fundamental Fysiks Group.

Specifically, in 1981, Nick Herbert, a member of the group, proposed a scheme for sending signals faster than the speed of light using quantum entanglement. Quantum computing pioneer Asher Peres writes that the refutation of Herbert's ideas led to the development of the no-cloning theorem by William Wootters, Wojciech Zurek, and Dennis Dieks.

In a review of Kaiser's book in Physics Today, Silvan Schweber challenges Kaiser's views of the importance of the Fundamental Fysiks Group. He writes that Bell's Theorem was not obscure during the preceding decade, but was worked on by authors such as John Clauser (who was a member of the group) and Eugene Wigner. Schweber also mentioned the work of Alain Aspect, which preceded Nick Herbert's 1981 proposal.

=== Remote viewing ===
Given quantum theory's perceived implications for the study of parapsychology and telepathy, the group cultivated patrons such as the Central Intelligence Agency, Defense Intelligence Agency, and the human potential movement. In 1972, the CIA and DIA set up a research program, jokingly called ESPionage, which financed experiments into remote viewing at the Stanford Research Institute (SRI), where the Fundamental Fysiks Group became what Kaiser calls its house theorists. The group also attempted in mid-1975 to independently reproduce the experiments done by SRI in the field; in particular, an experiment featuring one subject in the laboratory attempting to draw or describe a scene, observed by a different individual from a remote location outside of the laboratory. An independent panel of judges was to then determine how close the produced images were to the target location. These experiments were determined not to be statistically significant, though Kaiser notes that one subject showed detailed descriptions of other targets than the one in question at the time.

== See also ==
- Epistemological Letters
- The Men Who Stare at Goats
- List of New Age topics
- Parapsychology research at SRI
