= Evan Harris Walker =

American physicist and parapsychologist

- Born: 1935; Birmingham, Alabama, U.S.
- Died: August 17, 2006 (aged 70–71); Havre de Grace, Maryland, U.S.
- Education: University of Maryland
- Scientific career
- Fields: Physics, parapsychology

Evan Harris Walker (1935 – August 17, 2006) was an American physicist and parapsychologist.

== Biography ==
Walker was born in Birmingham, Alabama. He received his Ph.D. in physics from the University of Maryland in 1964. He received over a dozen patents and published more than a hundred papers in scientific journals.

Walker said he had undergone a Zen enlightenment experience in 1966 while walking in a field at the University of Maryland. This led him to reassess quantum mechanics, finding its indeterminacy incomplete.

He worked at the Ballistic Research Laboratories at the US Army's Aberdeen Proving Ground in Maryland. He wrote several articles which appeared in the Journal of Arthur M. Young's "Institute for the Study of Consciousness" ( founded in Berkeley in 1972). These papers greatly interested Nick Herbert and Saul-Paul Sirag, who invited him to talk to the Fundamental Fysiks Group in the mid-70s.

In 1981, Walker founded the Walker Cancer Research Institute, a nonprofit organization based in Aberdeen, Maryland, which funds public awareness of the risk of cancer and research for a cure.

Evan Harris Walker died, aged 70, on August 17, 2006, at Harford Memorial Hospital in Havre de Grace, Maryland.

== Writings ==
Walker promoted the charge that Albert Einstein "stole" special relativity from his first wife, Mileva Marić. (This claim has not been accepted by mainstream historians of science.) [Pais (1994), pp. 1–29; Holton (1996), pp. 177–193; Stachel (2002), p. 26-38; 39-55; Martinez, (2005), pp. 49–56.]

Walker believed that a quantum observer theory could explain paranormal phenomena.

In 1979, Walker and Richard Mattuck published a parapsychology paper proposing a quantum explanation for psychokinesis. Physicist Victor J. Stenger wrote that their explanation contained assumptions, not supported by any scientific evidence. According to Stenger their paper is "filled with impressive looking equations and calculations that give the appearance of placing psychokinesis on a firm scientific footing... Yet look what they have done. They have found the value of one unknown number (wavefunction steps) that gives one measured number (the supposed speed of PK-induced motion). This is numerology, not science."

Martin Gardner noted that Walker's parapsychological work was not supported by any scientific evidence and his quantum mechanical calculations to explain paranormal phenomena and God were an example of pseudoscience.

In the late 1990s Walker wrote 'The Fabric of Reality', about half of that work was published as The Physics of Consciousness. The book shows how an observer collapses the wave state and actualizes reality from the probability field of the quantum mechanical process responsible for the creation of human consciousness. Walker expanded on that with 'The Magic of Mind' which remained unpublished at the time of his death. Taken together, Walker's books moved the study of consciousness beyond any previous understanding and showed that something of us survives death and "opens the door to paranormal phenomena and God as Quantum Mind."

== Selected bibliography ==
- "The Scientific Study of Consciousness and its Significance for Religion," in Toward a Science of Consciousness, (Editor: J. W. White) W. A. Benjamin Inc., Menlo Park, CA, 1974.
- "Science/Consciousness/Religion," Science of Mind 47, 34—43, 1974.
- "Consciousness and Quantum Physics," in Future Science, (Editors: John White, Stanley Krippner) Anchor Press/Doubleday, 1977.
- "Quantum Mechanical Tunneling in Synaptic and Ephaptic Transmission, Int. J. Quantum Chemistry 11, 103—127, 1977.
- "The Compleat Quantum Mechanical Anthropologist," in Parapsychology and Anthropology (Editor: Joseph K. Long), Scarecrow Press, Metuchen, NJ, 1977.
- "The Action of Consciousness on Matter: A Quantum Mechanical Theory of Psychokinesis". In "The Iceland Papers: Select Papers on Experimental and Theoretical Research on the Physics of Consciousness: Frontiers of Physics Conference". Reykjavik, Iceland November 1977 edited by Andrija Puharich. pp. 111–159. Amherst WI: Essentia Research Associates, 1979.
- "The Quantum Theory of Psi Phenomena," Psychoenergetic Systems 3, 259—299, 1979.
- "Matching Bits with the Computer," Psychology Today 15, p 108, June 1981.
- "Book Review: Mind at Large by C. T. Tart, H. E. Puthoff, and R. Targ," J. Parapsychology, Dec. 1981.
- "Book Review: The Role of Consciousness in the Physical World by Robert Jahn," Parapsychological Review 13, # 4, 18—21, 1982.
- "Quantum Mechanics and Consciousness," J. Indian Psychology 4, No. 2, 21—26, 1985.
- "Information Measures in Quantum Mechanics," Physica B 151, 332—338, 1988.
- "Testing Schrödinger's paradox with a Michelson Interferometer," (with Drs. E. C. May, S. J. P. Spottiswoode, and T. Piantanida), Physica B 151, 339—348, 1988.
- "The Quantum Theory of Consciousness," The Noetic Journal, Vol. 1 #1, June 1997, pp 100–107.
- Book: The Physics of Consciousness, Perseus Press: Boston, MA. Published January, 2000.
- "The Natural Philosophy and Physics of Consciousness," in The Physical Nature of Consciousness, edited by Philip Van Loocke, John Benjamins Amsterdam/Philadelphia pp. 63–82, 2001.

(for a more complete list, see APA Bio)

== See also ==
- Quantum mind
- Quantum mysticism
- Measurement problem

== Sources ==
- "The Physics of Consciousness: The Quantum Mind and the Meaning of Life" by Evan Harris Walker, Ph.D., published in 2000 by Perseus Publishing, ISBN 0-7382-0436-6
- Holton (1996). Einstein, History, and Other Passions. Harvard University Press, pp. 177–193.
- Martinez, A. (2005). "Handling evidence in history: the case of Einstein's Wife". School Science Review, Vol. 86, No. 316 (March 2005), pp. 49–56.
- Pais (1994). Einstein Lived Here. Oxford University Press, pp. 1–29.
- Stachel (2002). Einstein from 'B' to 'Z'. Boston: Bïrkhauser, pp. 26–38; 49-56.
