= Quantum Reality =

Popular science book by physicist Nick Herbert

Quantum Reality: Beyond the New Physics
- Author: Nick Herbert
- Cover artist: Mort Weiss, Tita Nasol
- Subject: Quantum physics
- Published: 1985 (Anchor Books/Doubleday)
- Pages: 268
- ISBN: 978-0-385-18704-6
- Dewey Decimal: 530.1'2 82-46033
- LC Class: QC174.12.H47 1985

Quantum Reality is a 1985 popular science book by physicist Nick Herbert, a member of the Fundamental Fysiks Group which was formed to explore the philosophical implications of quantum theory. The book attempts to address the ontology of quantum objects, their attributes, and their interactions, without reliance on advanced mathematical concepts. Herbert discusses the most common interpretations of quantum mechanics and their consequences in turn, highlighting the conceptual advantages and drawbacks of each.

== Synopsis ==
=== Background ===
Following a brief summary of the experimental crises (such as the ultraviolet catastrophe) which motivated quantum theory, Herbert identifies four major formulations of quantum theory: Werner Heisenberg's matrix mechanics, Erwin Schrödinger's wave mechanics, Paul Dirac's transformation theory, and Richard Feynman's sum-over-histories formulation.

In introducing quantum objects (which he dubs "quons"), Herbert describes how quantum properties inhere in a wave function, which serves as a proxy for the measurement of these properties. He likens the quantum measurement process to mathematically treating the wave function as a summation of waveforms of a particular family, with various families corresponding to particular properties. The bandwidth of the spectrum of these waveforms represents the uncertainty in the quantum measurement. Herbert shows that for pairs of conjugate variables, such as position and momentum, these bandwidths are linked such that their product has a finite lower bound, thereby illustrating the basis of Heisenberg's uncertainty principle: any single property can be measured to arbitrary precision, but conjugate properties cannot simultaneously be known to arbitrary precision.

Herbert identifies two philosophical problems presented by quantum theory—the interpretation question, concerning the physical nature of the reality underlying observation; and the measurement problem, concerning the apparently special role of the measurement act in quantum theory, and various approaches to formally defining the measurement act.

=== Eight interpretations ===
Herbert identifies eight interpretations of quantum mechanics, all consistent with observation and with the aforementioned mathematical formalisms. He likens these different interpretations to the story of the blind men and an elephant—different approaches to the same underlying reality, which yield remarkably different (but often overlapping) pictures. The interpretations identified by Herbert are:

1. The Copenhagen interpretation, Part I ("There is no deep reality.") Most notably associated with Niels Bohr and Werner Heisenberg, Herbert identifies this as the most broadly accepted interpretation among physicists. In this interpretation, dynamic attributes do not describe the reality of quantum objects themselves, but inhere instead in the relationship between the observed object and the measurement device.
2. The Copenhagen interpretation, Part II ("Reality is created by observation.") In this variation of the Copenhagen interpretation, associated with John Archibald Wheeler, the reality of quantum attributes is created in the act of observation, as illustrated by the example of Wheeler's delayed choice experiment.
3. "Reality is an undivided wholeness." This interpretation, associated with David Bohm and Walter Heitler, suggests that the state of the entire universe may be implicated in any quantum measurement. Herbert highlights the apparent interaction of widely separated entangled particles, which may be represented by a single combined wave function, or "shared reality", in a high-dimensional configuration space.
4. The many-worlds interpretation. Devised by Hugh Everett, this interpretation does away with the conceptual problem of wave function collapse by supposing that all possible outcomes occur equally, in a constantly branching tree of parallel universes.
5. Quantum logic ("The world obeys a non-human kind of reasoning.") Associated with John von Neumann, Garrett Birkhoff, and David Finkelstein, this interpretation holds that quantum objects do possess innate attributes, but that the relationships between these attributes are governed by a non-distributive lattice, or "wave logic", unlike the Boolean lattice governing classical objects. In the example of the "three-polarizer paradox", two stacked, orthogonally-oriented polarizers will not allow any light to pass through (the meet of the sets of photons which will pass through each filter is null), yet the insertion of a diagonally-oriented polarizer between them allows some light to pass through the stack. The paradox can be understood by considering a polarized beam as a superposition, with diagonal components that interfere destructively.
6. Neorealism ("The world is made of ordinary objects.") Constructed by David Bohm and also associated with Louis de Broglie, this interpretation holds that quantum objects possess definite attributes, but that these attributes can change value instantly in response to events anywhere in the universe, with this information encoded in a physical pilot wave which must be able to travel faster than light. Other physicists attempted to construct object-based models which did away with this superluminal communication, but Bell's theorem later proved this to be impossible. For this reason, according to Herbert, neorealism is rejected by most of the physics establishment.
7. "Consciousness causes collapse". First proposed by Eugene Wigner, this interpretation grants special status to conscious minds as the location of wave function collapse, in which the myriad possibilities of a quantum system are narrowed to one observed state. Unlike the Copenhagen interpretation, in which the observer selects which attribute will be seen to have a definite value but does not determine the value itself, von Neumann contended that the actual attribute value is determined in a collapse that occurs at the interface of the brain and the mind.
8. "The duplex world of Werner Heisenberg." Heisenberg recognized a division inherent in the Copenhagen interpretation, between the concrete actuality (phenomenon) of observations and the range of potentiality (noumenon) described by the wave function. In seeking to address the ontological nature of the unobserved world, he considered quantum theory to be not merely a successful mathematical analogy, but a literal description of the underlying reality. In Herbert's description of Heisenberg's view, the unobserved world is a world composed of possibility, qualitatively less real than the world of observed fact.

=== Bell's theorem and its implications ===
Adding a further wrinkle to the nature of quantum reality, Herbert presents the EPR paradox, and its resolution in the form of Bell's theorem. The EPR paradox, resting on the long-held assumption of locality, suggests the existence of "elements of reality"—unmeasured quantum attributes which are nonetheless real—which are not predicted by quantum theory. Bell's theorem resolves this paradox by proving that locality is ruled out by observation—that any model of reality consistent with observation must allow for non-local interaction. However, Herbert is careful to note, Bell's theorem does not entail any prediction of experimentally observable non-local phenomena, nor does it allow for superluminal communication.

Herbert then re-evaluates the aforementioned interpretations of quantum reality in light of Bell's theorem:

- In the case of the Copenhagen interpretation, the "experimental arrangement" of observed entity and measurement device in which quantum attributes reside—considered by Bohr to be limited to the local interaction—must be expanded to include potentially distant objects with which these systems may be entangled.
- According to Herbert, Bell's theorem supports the Bohmian notion of underlying reality as an undivided wholeness.
- Although Herbert asserts that the many-worlds interpretation lacks the counterfactual definiteness required to prove Bell's theorem, he contends that the many-worlds view is inherently non-local, by any reasonable conception of locality.
- In Herbert's view, Bell's result strikes a major blow to neorealist models, by showing that the ostensibly real pilot wave must violate Einstein's universal speed limit.

Herbert concludes that, although Bell's theorem does not preclude any of the aforementioned interpretations of quantum mechanics, it insists that any valid interpretation must allow for non-local interaction.

== Reception ==
In its review of Quantum Reality, The New York Times praised Herbert's efforts at making the subject matter comprehensible to a lay audience. Physicist Heinz Pagels called Quantum Reality "a great place for the general reader to begin to learn about quantum physics". Kirkus Reviews, however, concluded that Quantum Reality, while engaging, may leave lay readers confused.

Post-anarchist writer Hakim Bey used Quantum Reality as the basis for an analysis of the field of quantum physics in terms of the social paradigms that it may influence, and from which it may draw its metaphors.

Physicist David Kaiser, who has written about the Fundamental Fysiks Group to which Herbert belonged, claims that the book is used in undergraduate physics courses.

Quantum Reality has been translated into German, Japanese, and Portuguese.

== See also ==
- Interpretations of quantum mechanics
- Fundamental Fysiks Group, with which Herbert is associated
  - The Dancing Wu Li Masters, by Fundamental Fysiks member Gary Zukav
  - The Tao of Physics, by Fundamental Fysiks member Fritjof Capra
