= WCRI =

WCRI may refer to:

- WCRI-FM, a radio station (95.9 FM) licensed to Block Island, Rhode Island, United States
- WSKP (AM), a radio station (1180 AM) licensed to Hope Valley, Rhode Island, United States, known as WCRI from 2011 to 2013
- Walker Cancer Research Institute, a small American cancer research organization
- Waterloo Co‑operative Residence Inc., a student housing co-operative located in Waterloo, Ontario, Canada
- World Conferences on Research Integrity
