= The Hidden Connections =

2002 book by Fritjof Capra

- Cover of the first edition
- Author: Fritjof Capra
- Language: English
- Subject: Complexity theory
- Publisher: Doubleday
- Publication date: August 20, 2002
- Publication place: United States
- Media type: Print (Hardcover and Paperback)
- Pages: 320 pp.
- ISBN: 978-0385494717

The Hidden Connections is a 2002 book by Fritjof Capra, in which the author proposes a holistic alternative to linear and reductionist world views. He aims to extend system dynamics and complexity theory to the social domain and presents "a conceptual framework that integrates life's biological, cognitive and social dimensions".

== Summary ==
The book is divided into a theoretical part (chapters 1 – 3) and a more practical part with application examples (chapters 4 – 7).

=== Part One ===
The first part begins with an introduction to prebiotic and biotic evolution theory and highlights the importance of membranes in this context. The author then goes into the details of different theories on cognition, consciousness, language and social co-ordination. His claim is that all biological and social phenomena are the result of the network characteristic of life. Therefore, system dynamics is the appropriate tool for analysing such phenomena.

In the centre piece of his book, Capra then proposes that life and social reality can be understood by applying a framework of four interconnected perspectives: form, matter, process and meaning. Capra believes that this systemic understanding can significantly advance other integrative social theories, in particular those of Jürgen Habermas and Anthony Giddens.

=== Part Two ===
The second part begins with a chapter on complexity and change, in which Capra presents a concept of management that recognizes the network characteristic of all human organizations. He explains how organizational learning and change can be facilitated by learning from life science. The fifth chapter is a profound critique of global capitalism. Capra takes up the research of Manuel Castells, who explains how globalization is shaped by modern communication technology and network phenomena. The author then explains that he sees the global market economy as an automaton with severe social and ecological impacts. Subsequently, Capra gives a detailed summary of the risks of modern biotechnology and makes a strong case against the dogma of genetic determinism. At the end of the book, the author appraises the rise of a global civil society, which he sees manifest in the 1999 Seattle WTO protests. Furthermore, he sees important potential in technological advances such as cradle-to-cradle design and hypercars.

== Reception ==
The book has been widely successful and translated into 8 languages. It has been appraised by reviewers as “a great introduction both to the nature of the problem and the logic of the response” and “a marvelous synthesis, so far in advance of any work along similar lines, that it will set the standard for the development of sustainable thought for some time to come.”

== See also ==
- Systems science

== Sources ==
- Capra, Fritjof (2002). The Hidden Connections. London: HarperCollins. ISBN 0-0025-7047-5.
- Capra, Fritjof (2003). The Hidden Connections: a science for sustainable living. London: Flamingo. ISBN 0-00-655158-0.
