= The Dancing Wu Li Masters =

Book by Gary Zukav

The Dancing Wu Li Masters: An Overview of the New Physics
- First edition
- Author: Gary Zukav
- Language: English
- Publisher: William Morrow
- Publication date: March 1979
- Publication place: United States
- Media type: Print (hardcover & paperback)
- Pages: 352
- ISBN: 0-688-03402-0
- OCLC: 4493031
- Dewey Decimal: 530.1/2
- LC Class: QC173.98 .Z84

The Dancing Wu Li Masters is a 1979 book by Gary Zukav, a popular science work exploring modern physics, and quantum phenomena in particular. It was awarded a 1980 U.S. National Book Award in category of Science. (Note: This was the award for paperback Science. From 1980 to 1983 in National Book Award history there were dual awards for hardcover and paperback books in many categories, including several nonfiction subcategories. Most paperback award-winners were reprints of earlier works; this one was eligible for both awards as a new book.) Although it explores empirical topics in modern physics research, The Dancing Wu Li Masters gained attention for leveraging metaphors taken from eastern spiritual movements, in particular the Huayen school of Buddhism with the monk Fazang's treatise on the Golden Lion, to explain quantum phenomena and has been regarded by some reviewers as a New Age work, although the book is mostly concerned with the work of pioneers in western physics down through the ages.

The toneless pinyin phrase Wu Li in the title is most accurately rendered 物理 in Chinese characters, one Chinese translation of the word "physics" (wù lǐ 物理) in the light of the book's subject matter. This becomes somewhat of a pun as there are many other Chinese characters that could be rendered as "wu li" in atonal pinyin, and chapters of the book are each titled with alternative translations of Wu Li, such as "Nonsense" (wú lǐ 無理), "My Way" and "I Clutch My Ideas". Zukav participated as a journalist in a 1976 physics conference of eastern and western scientists at Esalen Institute, California; and he used the occasion as material for his book. At the conference, it was said that the Chinese term for physics is 'Wu Li', or "patterns of organic energy." Zukav, among others, conceptualized 'physics' as the dance of the Wu Li Masters – teachers of physical essence. Zukav explains the concept further:

The Wu Li Master dances with his student. The Wu Li Master does not teach, but the student learns. The Wu Li Master always begins at the center, the heart of the matter...

== Editions ==
- The Dancing Wu Li Masters: An Overview of the New Physics (1979). New York: William Morrow and Company, hardcover: ISBN 0-688-03402-0, paperback: ISBN 0-688-08402-8, 352 p.
  - (1984) Bantam mass market paperback: ISBN 0-553-26382-X, 337 p.
  - (1990) Audio Renaissance audiocassette: ISBN 1-55927-058-6 (abridged)
  - (2001) Harper Perennial paperback: ISBN 0-06-095968-1, 416 p.
  - (2001) Audio Renaissance CD: ISBN 1-55927-643-6 (abridged)

== See also ==
- Quantum Reality, a 1985 popular science book by physicist Nick Herbert, member of the Fundamental Fysiks Group
- The Tao of Physics: An Exploration of the Parallels Between Modern Physics and Eastern Mysticism, a 1975 book by physicist Fritjof Capra
- The Universe in a Single Atom, 2005, by the 14th Dalai Lama
