= Time delay toxin activation =

National Library Kolkata

Time Delay Toxin Activation (TDTA) belongs to a class of chemotherapy drugs known as High Specificity Anticancer Agents. This is a process for manufacturing and administering chemotherapy drugs in a nontoxic, proto-drug form. Then, after a time delay to allow for concentration in the target cancer or invasive tissues or cells, the non-toxic drug is then modified by an activation drug to selectively provide toxic levels of a pharmacologically active agent to the target issue. This minimizes the toxicity to healthy cells, reducing the adverse side-effects of chemotherapy.

This idea was first proposed by Dr. Evan Harris Walker in 1980.
