= Mindwalk =

- VHS box art
- Directed by: Bernt Capra
- Written by: Floyd Byars; Fritjof Capra
- Based on: The Turning Point by Fritjof Capra
- Produced by: Adriana A.J. Cohen
- Starring: Liv Ullmann; Sam Waterston; John Heard; Ione Skye
- Cinematography: Karl Kases
- Edited by: Jean-Claude Piroué
- Music by: Philip Glass
- Distributed by: Triton Pictures
- Release dates: September 9, 1990 (TIFF); April 8, 1992 (United States)
- Running time: 112 minutes
- Country: United States
- Language: English

Mindwalk is a 1990 feature film directed by Bernt Capra, adapted from his short story based on The Turning Point, a nonfiction book by physicist Fritjof Capra, his brother.

== Plot ==
The film portrays a wide-ranging conversation among three characters: Sonia, a Norwegian physicist who abandoned a lucrative career after discovering that elements of her work were being applied to weapons development, Jack, an American politician attempting to make sense of his recent defeat as a presidential candidate, and Tom, a poet, Jack's close friend, and a disillusioned former political speechwriter, while they wander around Mont Saint-Michel, Normandy. The film introduces systems theory and systems thinking, along with insights into modern physical theories such as quantum mechanics and particle physics.

Political and social problems, and alternative solutions, are a focus of the film. However, the specific problems and solutions are not the primary concern; rather, different perspectives are presented through which these problems can be viewed and considered. Sonia Hoffman's perspective is referred to as the holistic, or systems theory, perspective. Thomas Harriman, the poet, recites the poem "Enigmas" by Pablo Neruda (based on the translation by Robert Bly) at the end of the movie, concluding the core discussion.

== Cast ==
- Liv Ullmann as Sonia Hoffman
- Sam Waterston as Jack Edwards
- John Heard as Thomas Harriman
- Ione Skye as Kit Hoffman
- Emmanuel Montes as Romain
- Gabrielle Danchik as Tour guide
- Jeanne van Phue as Tourist 1
- Penny White as Tourist 2
- Jean Boursin as Sacristan

== Production ==
The movie was filmed on site at the Mont Saint-Michel and has views of (and scenes conceptually based around) many structures and features there, including the approach over the tidal flats, the cathedral, the walkways, a torture chamber, and a giant, ancient clock mechanism.

== Release ==
The film had its world premiere at the Toronto International Film Festival in September 1990. It went on to play at the Sundance Film Festival and Mill Valley Film Festival. The film was acquired by Triton Pictures in April 1991 and opened in limited release in the United States on April 8, 1992.

== Reception ==
Michael Wilmington of the Los Angeles Times described the film as an "unusually good-looking movie", but said the complexities of its dialogue may be challenging to viewers and it will "most likely appeal to people who already agree with" its ecologically-minded ideas. Wilmington had praise for the lead actors, writing, "Ullmann, Waterston and Heard are such expert actors that they’re able to bend the script’s seeming didacticism: Ullmann by a quiet intensity that recalls her best roles for Ingmar Bergman; Waterston by a halting, gravelly, almost ingenuous phrasing that suggests Jerry Brown trying to be Jimmy Stewart; and Heard by a flow of spontaneous wisecracks, only some of which sound scripted. If the levels of personality aren’t too deeply in the script, the actors supply them."

Floyd Byars and Fritjof Capra received a nomination for Best Screenplay at the 7th Independent Spirit Awards.
