= Quantum mysticism =

Pseudoscience claiming to build on quantum mechanics

Quantum mysticism, sometimes referred to pejoratively as quantum quackery or quantum woo, is a set of metaphysical beliefs and associated practices that seek to relate spirituality or mystical worldviews to the ideas of quantum mechanics and its interpretations. Quantum mysticism is considered pseudoscience and quackery by quantum mechanics experts.

Before the 1970s the term was usually used in reference to the postulate that "consciousness causes collapse" but was later more closely associated with the purportedly pseudoscientific views espoused by New Age thinkers such as Fritjof Capra and other members of the Fundamental Fysiks Group, who were influential in popularizing the modern form of quantum mysticism.

== History ==
Many early quantum physicists held some interest in traditionally Eastern metaphysics. Physicists Werner Heisenberg and Erwin Schrödinger, two of the main pioneers of quantum mechanics in the 1920s, were interested in Eastern mysticism, but are not known to have directly associated one with the other.

The historian of religion Olav Hammer said that "Schrödinger's studies of Hindu mysticism never compelled him to pursue the same course as quantum metaphysicists such as David Bohm or Fritjof Capra." Schrödinger biographer Walter J. Moore said that Schrödinger's two interests of quantum physics and Hindu mysticism were "strangely dissociated".

In his 1961 paper "Remarks on the mind–body question", Eugene Wigner suggested that a conscious observer played a fundamental role in quantum mechanics, a concept which is part of the consciousness causes collapse interpretation. While his paper served as inspiration for later mystical works by others, Wigner's ideas were primarily philosophical and were not considered overtly pseudoscientific like the mysticism that followed. By the late 1970s, Wigner had shifted his position and rejected the role of consciousness in quantum mechanics. Harvard historian Juan Miguel Marin suggests that "consciousness [was] introduced hypothetically at the birth of quantum physics, [and] the term 'mystical' was also used by its founders, to argue in favor of and against such an introduction."

Mysticism was argued against by Albert Einstein. Einstein's theories have often been falsely believed to support mystical interpretations of quantum theory. Einstein said, with regard to quantum mysticism, "No physicist believes that. Otherwise he wouldn't be a physicist." He debates several arguments about the approval of mysticism, even suggesting Bohr and Pauli to be in support of and to hold a positive belief in mysticism which he believes to be false.

Niels Bohr denied quantum mysticism and had rejected the hypothesis that quantum theory requires a conscious observer as early as 1927, despite having been "sympathetic towards the hypothesis that understanding consciousness might require an extension of quantum theory to accommodate laws other than those of physics".

== In New Age thought ==
In the early 1970s, New Age culture began to incorporate ideas from quantum physics, beginning with books by Arthur Koestler, Lawrence LeShan and others which suggested that purported parapsychological phenomena could be explained by quantum mechanics.

In this decade, the Fundamental Fysiks Group emerged. This group of physicists embraced quantum mysticism, parapsychology, Transcendental Meditation, and various New Age and Eastern mystical practices.

Inspired in part by Wigner's exploration that consciousness causes collapse, Fritjof Capra, a member of the Fundamental Fysiks Group, wrote The Tao of Physics: An Exploration of the Parallels Between Modern Physics and Eastern Mysticism (1975), which espoused New Age quantum physics; the book was popular among the non-scientific public. In 1979, Gary Zukav, a non-scientist and "the most successful of Capra's followers", published The Dancing Wu Li Masters. The Fundamental Fysiks Group and Capra's book are said to be major influences for the rise of quantum mysticism as a pseudoscientific interpretation of quantum mechanics.

== Modern usage and examples ==
In contrast to the mysticism of the early 20th century, today quantum mysticism typically refers to New Age beliefs that combine ancient mysticism with the language of quantum mechanics. Called a pseudoscience and a "hijacking" of quantum physics, it draws upon "coincidental similarities of language rather than genuine connections" to quantum mechanics. Physicist Murray Gell-Mann coined the phrase "quantum flapdoodle" to refer to the misuse and misapplication of quantum physics to other topics.

An example of such use is New Age guru Deepak Chopra's "quantum theory" that aging is caused by the mind, expounded in his books Quantum Healing (1989) and Ageless Body, Timeless Mind (1993). In 1998, Chopra was awarded the parody Ig Nobel Prize in the physics category for "his unique interpretation of quantum physics as it applies to life, liberty, and the pursuit of economic happiness". In 2012, Stuart Hameroff and Chopra proposed that the "quantum soul" could exist "apart from the body" and "in space-time geometry, outside the brain, distributed nonlocally".

The 2004 film What the Bleep Do We Know!? dealt with a range of New Age ideas in relation to physics. It was produced by the Ramtha School of Enlightenment, founded by J.Z. Knight, a channeler who said that her teachings were based on a discourse with a 35,000-year-old disembodied entity named Ramtha. Featuring Fundamental Fysiks Group member Fred Alan Wolf, the film misused some aspects of quantum mechanics—including the Heisenberg uncertainty principle and the observer effect—as well as biology and medicine. Numerous critics dismissed the film for its use of pseudoscience.

== See also ==
- Buddhism and science
- Psi (parapsychology)
- Quantum pseudo-telepathy
- Quantum suicide and immortality
- Schrödinger's cat in popular culture
- Synchronicity
