= Center for Ecoliteracy =

The Center for Ecoliteracy (CEL) is a nonprofit organization dedicated to education for sustainable living.

== About ==
Located in Berkeley, California, the Center for Ecoliteracy's stated mission is to support and advance education for sustainable living. It was founded in 1995 by philanthropist Peter Buckley, physicist/author Fritjof Capra, and think tank director Zenobia Barlow to apply ecological, systems thinking principles to K-12 education.

The Center for Ecoliteracy has supported projects in habitat restoration, school gardens and cooking classes, partnerships between farms and schools, school food transformation, and curricular innovation. Together with the Chez Panisse Foundation and Berkeley Unified School District, the Center for Ecoliteracy implemented the School Lunch Initiative to provide local, seasonal, and sustainable meals for students as well as experiential learning in gardens, kitchen classrooms, and cafeterias. Using a systems approach, the Rethinking School Lunch program offers a planning strategy for revamping food service programs.

The Center for Ecoliteracy’s initiative, Smart by Nature: Schooling for Sustainability, aims to provide a framework based on four guiding principles: “Nature is Our Teacher,” “Sustainability is a Community Practice,” “The Real World is the Optimal Learning Environment,” and “Sustainable Living is Rooted in a Deep Knowledge of Place.” It identifies four potential pathways to schooling for sustainability—food, campus, community, and teaching and learning.

In August 2011, the Center for Ecoliteracy released Cooking with California Food in K-12 Schools, a downloadable cookbook and professional development guide for school food service professionals. It introduces the concept of the 6-5-4 School Lunch Matrix, "based on six dishes students know and love, five ethnic flavor profiles, and four seasons." Cooking with California Food is part of the Center's statewide initiative, Rethinking School Lunch: California Food for California Kids, which aims to add more fresh, local, and healthy foods to school meals.

In collaboration with bestselling author Daniel Goleman, the Center for Ecoliteracy published Ecoliterate: How Educators Are Cultivating Emotional, Social, and Ecological Intelligence in fall 2012. The book profiles educators, activists, and students who embody this integration of intelligences as they address food, water, and energy issues around the world. It also includes a professional development guide and five practices of "engaged ecoliteracy": developing empathy for all forms of life, embracing sustainability as a community practice, making the invisible visible, anticipating unintended consequences, and understanding how nature sustains life.

== Publications ==
- Daniel Goleman and Zenobia Barlow. Ecoliterate: How Educators Are Cultivating Emotional, Social, and Ecological Intelligence. San Francisco: Jossey-Bass, 2012.
- Georgeanne Brennan and Ann M. Evans. Cooking with California Food in K-12 Schools. Berkeley: Center for Ecoliteracy/Learning in the Real World, 2011.
- Michael K. Stone/Center for Ecoliteracy. Smart by Nature: Schooling for Sustainability. California: Watershed Media, September 2009.
- Center for Ecoliteracy. Big Ideas: Linking Food, Culture, Health, and the Environment. Berkeley: Center for Ecoliteracy/Learning in the Real World, 2008.
- Michael K. Stone and Zenobia Barlow, eds. Ecological Literacy: Educating Our Children for a Sustainable World. San Francisco: Sierra Club Books, 2005.
- Center for Ecoliteracy. “Rethinking School Lunch Guide.”
- Zenobia Barlow, ed. Ecoliteracy: Mapping the Terrain. Berkeley: Center for Ecoliteracy/Learning in the Real World, ASIN: B002AL1G3W. 2000.

== See also ==
- Education in the United States
- Environment of the United States
- Environmental groups and resources serving K–12 schools
