= The Turning Point (book) =

1982 book by Fritjof Capra

The Turning Point: Science, Society, and the Rising Culture
- Cover of the first edition
- Author: Fritjof Capra
- Language: English
- Subject: Philosophy
- Published: 1982
- Publisher: Bantam Books
- Publication place: United States
- Media type: Print (Hardcover and Paperback)
- Pages: 464 pp.
- ISBN: 0-553-01480-3
- Preceded by: The Tao of Physics

The Turning Point: Science, Society, and the Rising Culture is a 1982 book by Fritjof Capra, in which the author examines perceived scientific and economic crises through the perspective of systems theory.

== Summary ==
Capra outlines and traces the history of science and economics, highlighting flaws in the Cartesian, Newtonian, and reductionist paradigms which have come to light in the context of contemporary empirical understanding of the physical sciences. He writes that these paradigms are now inadequate to guide human behavior and policy with regard to modern technology and ecology, then argues that society needs to develop the concepts and insights of holism and systems theory to solve its complex problems. His argument is clearly and strongly expressed, for a wide readership, presuming no prior knowledge of any branch of the sciences. For physicists the book is an instructive guide to why and how today's new science may affect tomorrow's society. For non-scientists it will provide a rare insight into the world of scientific endeavours; for all readers alike this will be a useful synthesis of the histories of all branches of qualitative and quantitative enquiry.

== Overview ==
=== PART I: Crisis and Transformation ===
This section introduces the main themes of the book.

==== The Turning of the Tide ====
Amid the disciplines that have been influenced by the Cartesian world view and Newtonian physics and will have to adjust to be compatible with current physics' theories, Capra focuses on those dealing with health in the broadest ecological sense: from biology and medical science through psychology and psychotherapy, sociology, economics, and political science.

=== PART II- The Two Paradigms ===
In this section, the historical development of the Cartesian world view and the dramatic shift of basic concepts that has occurred in modern physics is described.

==== The Newtonian World-Machine ====
In this chapter, Capra states that Newtonian mechanics had lost its place as the fundamental theory of natural events by the end of the nineteenth century. Maxwell's electrodynamics and Darwin's theory of evolution both included elements that went beyond the Newtonian paradigm. This indicated that the universe was far more complicated than Descartes and Newton had envisioned. This scenario significantly changed in the first three decades of the twentieth century.

==== The New Physics ====
Capra states that his presentation of modern physics in this chapter is influenced by his personal beliefs and allegiances. He emphasized certain concepts and theories that are not yet accepted by the majority of physicists, but ones that he considers significant philosophically, of great importance for the other sciences and for our culture as a whole.

=== PART III- The Influence of Cartesian-Newtonian Thought ===
The profound influence of Cartesian-Newtonian thought on biology, medicine, psychology, and economics is discussed, and Capra presents his critique of the mechanistic paradigm in these disciplines.

==== The Mechanistic View of Life ====
In this chapter, Capra highlights the limitations of the reductionist approach.

==== The Biomedical Model ====
Capra argues that modern medicine loses sight of the patient as a human being because it focuses on smaller and smaller portions of the body. By reducing health to mechanical functioning, it is no longer able to cope with the phenomenon of healing, he argues. The mechanistic perspective of life has influenced physician attitudes regarding health and illness. He concludes that we can only transcend the biomedical model if we are prepared to adjust other aspects of our health for a social and cultural shift.

==== Newtonian Psychology ====
This chapter highlights how theory of mind may help psychiatrists to move beyond the typical Freudian framework when dealing with the whole range of human consciousness. Capra describes how the expansion of physicists' research to atomic and subatomic phenomena has led them to accept notions that defy all of our common-sense beliefs.

==== The Impasse of Economics ====
Capra argues that future economic philosophy will make explicit reference to human attitudes, beliefs, and lifestyles, making his suggested new science fundamentally humanistic. It will deal with human goals and potentials and incorporate them into the global ecosystem's underlying matrix. Capra writes that such an approach could outperform existing scientific approaches.

==== The Dark Side of Growth ====
Capra outlines how the new framework will be deeply ecological, compatible with many traditional cultures' viewpoints, and fit with current physics' conceptions and theories. As a physicist, he finds it rewarding to see that modern physics' worldview has the potential to be therapeutic and culturally unifying, in addition to having a great impact on other sciences.

=== PART IV- The New Vision of Reality ===
In the fourth part of the book, the critique is followed by a detailed discussion of the new vision of reality.

==== The Systems View of Life ====
In contrast to the neo-Darwinian theory, Capra evaluates Teilhard de Chardin's theory of evolution. In this chapter, Capra expresses his confidence that his ideas will be seen in a new light as a result of the new systems approach to the study of living beings, and that they will contribute considerably to the popular recognition of the harmony between scientists and mystics.

==== Wholeness and Health ====
In this chapter, Capra discusses the Simonton approach, which is a conceptual framework and therapy developed by Carl Simonton, a radiation oncologist, and Stephanie Matthews-Simonton, a psychotherapist. Cancer patients, for example, are compelled to consider their life objectives, and relationship to the universe as a whole, which is why Capra feels their approach is so useful to health care as a whole.

==== Journeys Beyond Space and Time ====
If experiential psychotherapies are familiar with the new paradigm coming from current physics, systems biology, and transpersonal psychology, they will be far more effective. The final impediment to experiential therapies is no longer an emotional or physical barrier, but rather a cognitive one.

==== The Passage to the Solar Age ====
In the final chapter, Capra concludes that while the revolution is occurring, the decaying culture refuses to compromise, clinging to old notions with increasing tenacity; and the dominant social institutions will not relinquish their leadership roles to the new cultural forces. Capra argues that these institutions will, however, inevitably collapse, while the developing culture will continue to rise and finally take over as the dominant culture. As the turning point advances, he says, the awareness that large-scale evolutionary changes cannot be halted by short-term political manipulation gives us the most optimism for the future.

== Reception ==
A review by Catherine Twomey Fosnot, published by the journal Educational Communication and Technology, stated that Capra's book says nothing regarding education. Yet, due to the fact that it offers a vastly different, contemporary physicist's view of technology, it has the potential of becoming a ‘turning point’.

James Connolly of the Bethlehem University Journal expressed in his review that there was a certainty that some individuals would be will be tempted cynically to reflect that they have heard of previous books offering survival mechanisms to humanity, when picking up The Turning Point. However, given the nuclear threat, the millions of avoidable yearly deaths through starvation on our planet and the ruination of our environment by technological products, Connolly voiced that "any author who suggests a cure for these evils is worthy of the attention of those who are anxious to see their fellow humans survive…”.

Somaditya Banerjee of the Physics Bulletin reviewed that Capra's argument was clearly and strongly expressed, for a wide readership, presuming no prior knowledge of any branch of the sciences. For physicists the book is an instructive guide to why and how today's new science may affect tomorrow's society. For non-scientists it will provide a rare insight into the world of scientific endeavours; for all readers alike this will be a useful synthesis of the histories of all branches of qualitative and quantitative enquiry. At least in this latter respect, this thought-provoking and well researched book is likely to remain unrivalled for some time to come.

Philip Zaleski's review in The Boston Phoenix was more skeptical, noting that "In Taoist terms, which Capra favors, we suffer from too much yang (masculine aggression, competition and analysis) and too little yin (feminine cooperation, intuition and synthesis). Salvation lies in 'a new paradigm — a new vision of reality, a fundamental change in our thoughts, perceptions and values.' Capra dubs this futuristic philosophy 'deep ecology,' and hails it, with all the fervor and faith of a soapbox evangelist, as the grand confluence of the 'systems view of life, mind, consciousness and evolution; the corresponding holistic approach to health and healing; the integration of Western and Eastern approaches to psychology and psychotherapy; and an ecological and feminist perspective which is spiritual in its ultimate nature.' The Turning Point busies itself with evoking, elaborating, and encouraging each of these promising potions for spiritual rejuvenation."..."If Capra’s 'new paradigm' smells a bit stale, like a whiff of air from a time capsule buried some 15 years ago, you're not mistaken."..."Capra fails to persuade, in part, because his vocabulary is so hip it sounds worn out. 'Holistic,' 'oneness,' and other buzzwords swarm around his pages like intellectual will-o’the-wisps."

== Influence ==
The 1990 film, Mindwalk, is based on the book.

A review by Frederic and Mary Ann Brussat of the film, Mindwalk, directed by Bernt Capra, stated that for the characters, “talking about the world of ideas and values is an adventure. Those of like mind will savour Mindwalk's smorgasbord approach to science, history, politics, the nature of evil, and the Gaia Hypothesis as a real treat.”

Michael Wilmington of the LA Times, said, “There’s only one problem: Just as this movie’s conversation suggests one man talking to himself ardently, the often excellent “Mindwalk” is most likely to appeal to people who already agree with it.”

In 2009, a journal report was published by African Journals Online, on Capra’s health and well-being approach in The Turning Point. Their topic of interest in the article is with the paradigm shift advocated by Capra in the book and the progress that has since been made.

== Publication data ==
- Fritjof Capra, The Turning Point: Science, Society, and the Rising Culture, (1982), Simon and Schuster, Bantam paperback 1983: ISBN 0-553-34572-9
  - Doubleday Dell, mass market paperback 1984: ISBN 0-553-34148-0
  - Flamingo Press, 1990 edition: ISBN 0-00-654017-1
  - Sounds True audio cassette, 1990

== See also ==
- Mindwalk (film)
- The Tao of Physics (book)
