= The Tao of Physics =

1975 book by Fritjof Capra

- Cover of the first edition
- Author: Fritjof Capra
- Language: English
- Subject: Physics
- Published: 1975
- Publisher: Shambhala Publications
- Publication place: United States
- Media type: Print (hardcover and paperback)
- Pages: 356 pp. (Hardcover)
- ISBN: 978-0704501423
- Followed by: The Turning Point

The Tao of Physics: An Exploration of the Parallels Between Modern Physics and Eastern Mysticism is a 1975 book by physicist Fritjof Capra. A bestseller in the United States, it has been translated into 23 languages. Capra summarized his motivation for writing the book: "Science does not need mysticism and mysticism does not need science. But man needs both."

== Origin ==
According to the preface of the first edition, reprinted in subsequent editions, Capra struggled to reconcile theoretical physics and Eastern mysticism and was at first "helped on my way by 'power plants'" or psychedelics, with the first experience "so overwhelming that I burst into tears, at the same time, not unlike Castaneda, pouring out my impressions to a piece of paper". (p. 12, 4th ed.)

Capra later discussed his ideas with Werner Heisenberg in 1972, as he mentioned in the following interview excerpt:

I had several discussions with Heisenberg. I lived in England then [circa 1972], and I visited him several times in Munich and showed him the whole manuscript chapter by chapter. He was very interested and very open, and he told me something that I think is not known publicly because he never published it. He said that he was well aware of these parallels. While he was working on quantum theory he went to India to lecture and was a guest of Tagore. He talked a lot with Tagore about Indian philosophy. Heisenberg told me that these talks had helped him a lot with his work in physics, because they showed him that all these new ideas in quantum physics were in fact not all that crazy. He realized there was, in fact, a whole culture that subscribed to very similar ideas. Heisenberg said that this was a great help for him. Niels Bohr had a similar experience when he went to China.

Bohr adopted the yin yang symbol as part of his coat of arms when he was knighted in 1947; it is claimed in the book that it was a result of orientalist influences.

The Tao of Physics was followed by other books of the same genre like The Hidden Connection, The Turning Point and The Web of Life in which Capra extended the argument of how Eastern mysticism and scientific findings of today relate, and how Eastern mysticism might also have the linguistic and philosophical tools required to undertake to some of the biggest scientific challenges remaining.

== Afterword to the third edition ==
In the afterword to the third edition (published in 1982, pp 360–368 of the 1991 edition) Capra offers six suggestions for a new paradigm in science.

- Consider the part and the whole as more symmetrically conditioning one another.
- Replace thinking in terms of structure with thinking in terms of process.
- Replace ‘objective science’ with ‘epistemic science’, where the approach to decide what counts as knowledge adapts to the subject studied.
- Replace the idea of knowledge as buildings based on foundations with an idea of knowledge as networks.
- Abandon the quest for truth with a quest for better approximations.
- Abandon the ideas of domination of nature with one of cooperation and nonviolence.

Capra reconnects this new paradigm to the theories of living and self-organizing systems that has emerged from cybernetics. Here he quotes Ilya Prigogine, Gregory Bateson, Humberto Maturana and Francisco Varela (p. 372 of the 1991 edition).

== Acclaim and criticism ==
According to Capra, Werner Heisenberg was in agreement with the main idea of the book:

I showed the manuscript to him chapter by chapter, briefly summarizing the content of each chapter and emphasizing especially the topics related to his own work. Heisenberg was most interested in the entire manuscript and very open to hearing my ideas. I told him that I saw two basic themes running through all the theories of modern physics, which were also the two basic themes of all mystical traditions-the fundamental interrelatedness and interdependence of all phenomena and the intrinsically dynamic nature of reality. Heisenberg agreed with me as far as physics was concerned and he also told me that he was well aware of the emphasis on interconnectedness in Eastern thought. However, he had been unaware of the dynamic aspect of the Eastern world view and was intrigued when I showed him with numerous examples from my manuscript that the principal Sanskrit terms used in Hindu and Buddhist philosophy-brahman, rta, lila, karma, samsara, etc.-had dynamic connotations. At the end of my rather long presentation of the manuscript Heisenberg said simply: "Basically, I am in complete agreement with you."

The book was a best-seller in the United States. It received a positive review from New York magazine:

A brilliant best-seller ... Lucidly analyzes the tenets of Hinduism, Buddhism, and Taoism to show their striking parallels with the latest discoveries in cyclotrons.

Victor N. Mansfield, a professor of physics and astronomy at Colgate University who wrote many papers and books of his own connecting physics to Buddhism and also to Jungian psychology, complimented The Tao of Physics in Physics Today:

Fritjof Capra, in The Tao of Physics, seeks ... an integration of the mathematical world view of modern physics and the mystical visions of Buddha and Krishna. Where others have failed miserably in trying to unite these seemingly different world views, Capra, a high-energy theorist, has succeeded admirably. I strongly recommend the book to both layman and scientist.

However, it is not without its critics. Jeremy Bernstein, a professor of physics at the Stevens Institute of Technology, chastised The Tao of Physics:

At the heart of the matter is Mr. Capra's methodology – his use of what seem to me to be accidental similarities of language as if these were somehow evidence of deeply rooted connections. Thus I agree with Capra when he writes, "Science does not need mysticism and mysticism does not need science but man needs both." What no one needs, in my opinion, is this superficial and profoundly misleading book.

Leon M. Lederman, a Nobel Prize-winning physicist and current Director Emeritus of Fermilab, criticized both The Tao of Physics and Gary Zukav's The Dancing Wu Li Masters in his 1993 book The God Particle: If the Universe Is the Answer, What Is the Question?

Starting with reasonable descriptions of quantum physics, he constructs elaborate extensions, totally bereft of the understanding of how carefully experiment and theory are woven together and how much blood, sweat, and tears go into each painful advance.

Philosopher of science Eric Scerri criticizes both Capra and Zukav and similar books.

Peter Woit, a mathematical physicist at Columbia University, criticized Capra for continuing to build his case for physics-mysticism parallels on the bootstrap model of strong-force interactions set out at the end of the book, long after the Standard Model had become thoroughly accepted by physicists as a better model:

The Tao of Physics was completed in December 1974, and the implications of the November Revolution one month earlier that led to the dramatic confirmations of the standard-model quantum field theory clearly had not sunk in for Capra (like many others at that time). What is harder to understand is that the book has now gone through several editions, and in each of them Capra has left intact the now out-of-date physics, including new forewords and afterwords that with a straight face deny what has happened. The foreword to the second edition of 1983 claims, "It has been very gratifying for me that none of these recent developments has invalidated anything I wrote seven years ago. In fact, most of them were anticipated in the original edition," a statement far from any relation to the reality that in 1983 the standard model was nearly universally accepted in the physics community, and the bootstrap theory was a dead idea ... Even now, Capra's book, with its nutty denials of what has happened in particle theory, can be found selling well at every major bookstore. It has been joined by some other books on the same topic, most notably Gary Zukav's The Dancing Wu-Li Masters. The bootstrap philosophy, despite its complete failure as a physical theory, lives on as part of an embarrassing New Age cult, with its followers refusing to acknowledge what has happened.

In a 2019 commemoration in honour of physicist Geoffrey Chew, one of bootstrap's "fathers", Capra replied to criticisms such as Woit's:

However, the standard model does not include gravity, and hence fails to integrate all known particles and forces into a single mathematical framework. The currently most popular candidate for such a framework is string theory, which pictures all particles as different vibrations of mathematical "strings" in an abstract 9-dimensional space. The mathematical elegance of string theory is compelling, but the theory has serious deficiencies. If these difficulties persist, and if a theory of "quantum gravity" continues to remain elusive, the bootstrap idea may well be revived someday, in some mathematical formulation or other.

== Editions ==
- The Tao of Physics, Fritjof Capra, Shambhala Publications, 1975
  - Shambhala, 2nd edition 1983: ISBN 0-394-71612-4 Bantam reprint 1985: ISBN 0-553-26379-X
  - Shambhala, 3rd edition 1991: ISBN 0-87773-594-8
  - Shambhala, 4th edition 2000: ISBN 1-57062-519-0
  - Shambhala, 5th edition 2010: ISBN 978-1590308356
  - Audio Renaissance, 1990 audio cassette tape: ISBN 1-55927-089-6
  - Audio Renaissance, 2004 audio compact disc (abridged) ISBN 1-55927-999-0

== See also ==
- Quantum mysticism
- Quantum Reality
- The Dancing Wu Li Masters
- The Turning Point
- The Universe in a Single Atom
- War of the Worldviews
