= Walker Cancer Research Institute =

US non-profit organization

- Formation: 1981
- Type: Cancer Research
- Headquarters: Aberdeen, Maryland
- Location: United States
- President: Helen Marie Walker
- Website: walkercri.org

The Walker Cancer Research Institute (WCRI) is an American cancer research organization consisting of two laboratories located in the states of Florida and Michigan and principal organizational offices in Maryland. WCRI and the affiliated project National Cancer Research Center (NCRC) were incorporated as nonprofit 501(c)(3) charitable organizations in 1981. Dr. Evan Harris Walker, who founded the Institute, died in 2006 and was succeeded by his wife, Helen Marie Walker, as President. Helen Marie died in November 2016. Steven L. Blumenthal, also one of the founders, remains the current president.

== Research ==
Research by WCRI is conducted at its two laboratories. The Florida lab, called the Natural Products Laboratory, was established in 1992. WCRI is currently listed among the industry and research partners of the Florida State University College of Engineering. The Michigan lab, called the Experimental Anti-Cancer Drug Synthesis Laboratory, is located on the campus of Wayne State University and was established in 1990. The founder of WCRI was Evan Harris Walker, formerly of NASA. Dr. Walker's discovery of time delay toxin activation (TDTA) chemotherapy was a precipitating event in the formation of the Institute and formed the basis of a collaborative relationship with Battelle, which began in 1988. At least one patent has been granted to the Institute, having been filed in 2002 and awarded in 2004.

WCRI has neither published research nor been awarded a patent since 2004. The address listed on the WRCI website for administrate offices is 18 N. Law StreetAberdeen, Maryland 21001. 18 N Law St., Aberdeen MD is a 3-bedroom ranch house, and is the location of Around the World Inc. Internet Cafe.

== Fundraising ==
Charitable organizations differ in and are often compared on the basis of their methods of fundraising and the percentage of funds going toward primary mission aims versus administrative overhead. They also differ in the manner in which they treat donor lists and contact information. Information available from 2000–2003 indicates that WCRI applies approximately 40% of funds collected to the stated goals of the center, such as research and public education; the remaining 60% of funds raised were spent primarily on expenses incurred in raising funds, such as letters to potential donors. Fundraising for WCRI is conducted in part through the NCRC project via direct-mail campaigns.

The WCRI has a zero-star ranking on Charity Navigator. Charity Navigator reports that fund raising account for 89% of expenses, resulting in a very low charity effectiveness rating.

Steven L. Blumenthal is listed on the WCRI website as vice president. Mr. Blumenthal lives in West Palm Beach Fl.

In 2016, The Walker Cancer Research Institute settled a lawsuit with the State of New Jersey for deceptive fund raising and paid the penalty to Rutgers University, New Jersey.

== See also ==
- Florida State University College of Engineering
