= Fred Alan Wolf =

American theoretical physicist

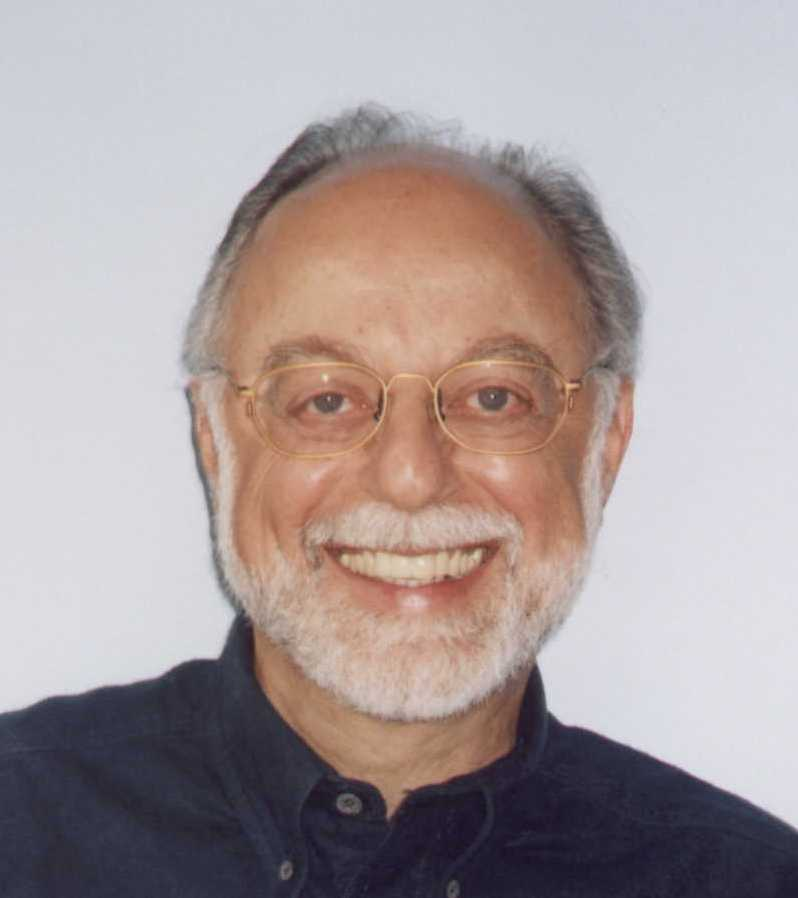
- Wolf, c. 2005
- Born: December 3, 1934 (age 91)
- Education: PhD in theoretical physics, 1963
- Alma mater: University of California, Los Angeles
- Occupations: Physicist, science writer
- Website: www.fredalanwolf.com

Fred Alan Wolf (born December 3, 1934) is an American theoretical physicist specializing in quantum physics and the relationship between physics and consciousness. He is a former physics professor at San Diego State University, and has helped to popularize science on the Discovery Channel. He is the author of a number of physics-themed books including Taking the Quantum Leap (1981), The Dreaming Universe (1994), Mind into Matter (2000), and Time Loops and Space Twists (2011).

Wolf was a member in the 1970s, with Jack Sarfatti and others, of the Lawrence Berkeley Laboratory's Fundamental Fysiks Group founded in May 1975 by Elizabeth Rauscher and George Weissmann. His theories about the interrelation of consciousness and quantum physics were described by Newsweek in 2007 as "on the fringes of mainstream science."

== Biography ==
Born into a Jewish family, Wolf's interest in physics began as a child when he viewed a newsreel depicting the world's first atomic explosion. Wolf received his Ph.D. in theoretical physics from UCLA in 1963 and began researching the field of high atmospheric particle behavior following a nuclear explosion. He has appeared as the resident physicist on the Discovery Channel's The Know Zone, was a participant in the PBS series Closer to Truth, and has appeared on radio talk shows and television shows across the United States and abroad. He also appeared in the films What the Bleep Do We Know!? (2004), The Secret (2006) and Spirit Space (2008). He has lectured on subjects related to quantum physics and consciousness since the 1960s, often under the name Dr. Quantum or Captain Quantum. He is also featured in the documentary about the Dalai Lama, titled Dalai Lama Renaissance.

His book Taking the Quantum Leap: The New Physics for Nonscientists won a 1982 U.S. National Book Award in Science. (Note: This was the 1982 award for paperback Science. From 1980 to 1983 in National Book Awards history there were dual hardcover and paperback awards in most categories, and multiple nonfiction subcategories. Most of the paperback award-winners were reprints of books eligible for previous awards; this one was original.)

He has taught at San Diego State University, the University of Paris, the Hebrew University of Jerusalem, the University of London, University of Paris at Orsay and Birkbeck College, London.

== Works ==
Books

- Taking the Quantum Leap: The New Physics for Nonscientists (September 1981) Harper Perennial (Revised edition January 25, 1989) ISBN 0-06-096310-7, ISBN 978-0-06-096310-1
- Space-Time and Beyond (1982, with Bob Toben and Jack Sarfatti) Paperback by Bantam; (July 1, 1983) ISBN 0-553-26656-X, ISBN 978-0-553-26656-6
- Star Wave: Mind, Consciousness and Quantum Physics (1984) Macmillan Publishing co. ISBN 0-02-630860-6.
- Mind and the New Physics (1985) Heinemann ISBN 0-434-87770-0, ISBN 978-0-434-87770-6
- The Body Quantum: The New Physics of Body, Mind and Health (1986) Macmillan Pub Co ISBN 0-02-630890-8, ISBN 978-0-02-630890-8
- Parallel Universes: The Search for Other Worlds (1988) Simon & Schuster (Reprint edition February 15, 1990) ISBN 0-671-69601-7, ISBN 978-0-671-69601-6
- The Eagle's Quest: A Physicist's Search for Truth in the Heart of the Shamanic World (1991) Touchstone (Reprint edition November 1, 1992) ISBN 0-671-79291-1, ISBN 978-0-671-79291-6
- The Dreaming Universe : A Mind-Expanding Journey Into the Realm Where Psyche and Physics Meet (1994) Simon & Schuster ISBN 0-671-74946-3, ISBN 978-0-671-74946-0
- The Spiritual Universe: One Physicists Vision of Spirit, Soul, Matter, and Self (1996) Published by Simon & Schuster. (Moment Point Press; 2Rev Ed edition October 1, 1998) ISBN 0-9661327-1-8, ISBN 978-0-9661327-1-7
- Mind into Matter: A New Alchemy of Science and Spirit (2000) Moment Point Press ISBN 0-9661327-6-9, ISBN 978-0-9661327-6-2
- Matter Into Feeling: A New Alchemy of Science and Spirit (2002) Moment Point Press ISBN 1-930491-00-X, 9781930491007
- The Yoga of Time Travel: How the Mind Can Defeat Time (2004) Quest Books ISBN 0-8356-0828-X, ISBN 978-0-8356-0828-2
- The Little Book of BLEEPS by William Arntz and Betsy Chasse (November 2004) (Wolf contributor/interviewed) Captured Light Distribution ISBN 0-9761074-0-6, ISBN 978-0-9761074-0-8
- Dr. Quantum's Little Book of Big Ideas: Where Science Meets Spirit (2005) Moment Point Press ISBN 1-930491-08-5, ISBN 978-1-930491-08-3
- What the BLEEP Do We Know!? - Discovering the Endless Possibilities For Altering Your Everyday Reality by William Arntz, Betsy Chasse & Mark Vincente (November 1, 2005) (Wolf contributor/interviewed) HCI ISBN 0-7573-0334-X, ISBN 978-0-7573-0334-0
- Dr. Quantum in the Grandfather Paradox (with Etan Boritzer) (2007) Elora Media ISBN 0-9786813-3-9, ISBN 978-0-9786813-3-3
- Time Loops and Space Twists (2010) Hierophant Publishing ISBN 978-0-9818771-3-6
- "El Retorno de los sabios" Coautor Jose Ignacio Carmona(2013) ISBN 9788494113314

Films

- What the Bleep Do We Know!? (2004) Lord of the Wind Films, LLC
- What the BLEEP – Down the Rabbit Hole - Quantum Edition Multi-Disc DVD Set (2006) Lord of the Wind Films, LLC
- The Secret (2006) Prime Time Productions
- Dalai Lama Renaissance (2007) Wakan Films
- Spirit Space (2008) WireWerks Digital Media Productions
- Rabbit Hole (film) (2010). Wolf's name is visible on a book on parallel universes, an important concept in the film.

Audio

- Dr. Quantum Presents: A User's Guide To Your Universe (2005) Sounds True Audio CD (ISBN 978-1591793489)
- Dr. Quantum Presents: Meet the Real Creator—You! (2005) Sounds True Audio CD (ISBN 978-1-59179-380-9)
- Dr. Quantum Presents: Do-It-Yourself Time Travel (2008) Sounds True Audio CD (ISBN 978-1-59179-946-7)

== See also ==
- Quantum mysticism
