= Gary Zukav =

American author

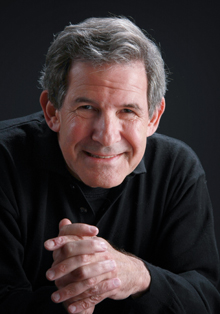
- Zukav in 2009
- Born: October 17, 1942 (age 83); Port Arthur, Texas
- Education: Harvard University; Sonoma State College
- Occupations: Writer, public speaker
- Partner: Linda Francis (1993; died 2022)
- Writing career
- Subjects: Spirituality, Self-Help, Empowerment, New-age
- Notable works: The Dancing Wu Li Masters (1979); The Seat of the Soul (1989)
- Website: seatofthesoul.com

Gary Zukav (born October 17, 1942) is an American author known for his works on human consciousness and spirituality, including four consecutive New York Times Best Sellers. Beginning in 1998, he appeared more than 30 times on The Oprah Winfrey Show to discuss transformation in human consciousness concepts presented in his book The Seat of the Soul. His first book, The Dancing Wu Li Masters (1979), won a U.S. National Book Award. (Note: This was the 1980 award for paperback (Science). From 1980 to 1983 in National Book Award history there were dual awards for hardcover and paperback books in many categories, and several nonfiction subcategories including General Nonfiction. Most paperback award-winners were reprints of earlier works; this one was eligible for both awards as a new book.)

== Life ==
Gary Zukav was born in Port Arthur, Texas, the elder of two children of Morris Luis "Morey" and Lorene (née Weinberg) Zukav. His father owned a jewelry store in Pittsburg, Kansas, and his mother was a housewife who raised him and his younger sister. Gary spent his early childhood in San Antonio and Houston. His family moved to Pittsburg, Kansas in 1952, while he was in fourth grade. In 1960, he graduated from Pittsburg High School as valedictorian. During that time he became an Eagle Scout, Governor of Kansas Boy's State, President of the Student Council, and Kansas State Debate championship team member twice.

In 1959, Gary received a scholarship to Harvard and matriculated in 1960. In his junior year at Harvard, he left to motorcycle in Europe, North Africa, and the Middle East before returning the following year. In 1964, he was deeply moved by the murders of Chaney, Goodman, and Schwerner in Philadelphia, Mississippi, and worked as a summer volunteer for the National Association for the Advancement of Colored People (NAACP) in Jackson, Mississippi, under the direction of Charles Evers, brother of the slain Medgar Evers. In 1965, he graduated from Harvard. That same year he enlisted in the U.S. Army and entered U.S. Army Infantry Officer Candidate School. He was made a second lieutenant in 1966. He volunteered for the U.S. Army Special Forces (Green Berets), completed parachute training (Fort Benning, Georgia), and U.S. Army Special Warfare School (Fort Bragg, North Carolina), then served as a detachment executive officer in Okinawa and Vietnam, participating in top secret operations in Vietnam and Laos. He left Vietnam after the Tet Offensive of January 1968 and was discharged from the army in 1968 as a first lieutenant.

Zukav returned to the U.S. in 1970 and moved to San Francisco, California. He described this period as one marked by personal struggles, including issues with sexual behavior, anger, and drug use. This continued until 1975 when his roommate, Jack Sarfatti, took him to visit the Lawrence Berkeley Laboratory where Zukav became intrigued by quantum physics. He began writing his first book, The Dancing Wu Li Masters, written with extensive help from Jack Sarfatti and other physicists he met through Sarfatti, as described in David Kaiser's book How the Hippies Saved Physics. He referred to this book as his 'first gift to Life,' reflecting his view of its significance. In 1987 he moved to Mount Shasta, California, where he lived in a cabin as a self-described "secular monk" and spent time in the surrounding wilderness. In 1993 he met and later married Linda Francis. They co-founded the Seat of the Soul Institute in 1998 and moved to Ashland, Oregon, in 2000.

== Teachings ==
Zukav introduces the idea that aligning the personality with a soul leads to the creation of what he terms 'authentic power,' a cornerstone of his philosophy. He asserts that a transformation of humanity is underway from a species that is limited to the perceptions of the five senses, evolves by surviving, and survives by pursuing "external power", which he defines as the ability to manipulate and control, into a species that is not limited to the perceptions of the five senses, evolves by growing spiritually, and grows spiritually by creating authentic power. He further asserts that humanity is undergoing a transformation toward 'authentic power,' which he defines as spiritual growth and alignment with the soul.

According to Zukav, creating authentic power is a highly personal endeavor that requires the development of emotional awareness, responsible choice, intuition, and trust in the Universe, which he describes as "alive, wise, and compassionate". He asserts that each individual can create authentic power only for himself or herself. He defines intention as a "quality of consciousness that infuses an action", i.e., the reason or motivation for the action, and choice of intention as the "fundamental creative act" that each individual performs continually, whether unconsciously or consciously. Creating authentic power requires consciously choosing intentions that create consequences for which the chooser is willing to assume responsibility (responsible choice), which requires emotional awareness, and which intuition can assist.

Zukav distinguishes the "Old Male" (five-sensory, protector, provider) and the "Old Female" (five-sensory, child bearer, homemaker) who join in marriage in order to enhance probabilities of survival and comfort from the emerging "New Male" (multi-sensory, intuitive, emotionally aware) and the "New Female" (multi-sensory, capable in all chosen endeavors) who join in a new kind of relationship in order to create authentic power and assist each other in creating authentic power. He calls this relationship a "spiritual partnership" and defines it as a "partnership between equals for the purpose of spiritual growth". According to Zukav, "spiritual growth now requires relationships of substance and depth" and only spiritual partnerships are able to support all multi-sensory individuals (not only couples) in creating authentic power. Zukav introduced the concept of the 'Universal Human,' which he describes as an ideal being 'beyond nation, religion, race, sex, and economic status,' though this concept is primarily rooted in his spiritual framework.

== Publications ==
- Universal Human: Creating Authentic Power and the New Consciousness (2021). Atria Books. ISBN 978-1982169879.
- Spiritual Partnership (2010). New York: Harper One. ISBN 978-0-06-145850-7.
- Soul to Soul (2007) ISBN 0-7432-3700-5
- Self-Empowerment Journal: A Companion to The Mind of the Soul: Responsible Choice (2003), co-author Linda Francis. ISBN 0-7432-5746-4
- The Mind of the Soul: Responsible Choice (2003), co-author Linda Francis. ISBN 0-7432-3698-X – New York Times best seller
- Thoughts from the Heart of the Soul: Meditations for Emotional Awareness (2002), co-author Linda Francis. ISBN 0-7432-3728-5
- The Heart of the Soul: Emotional Awareness (2002), co-author Linda Francis. ISBN 0-7432-3496-0 – New York Times best seller
- Thoughts from the Seat of the Soul (2001) ISBN 0-7432-2789-1
- Soul Stories (2000). ISBN 0-7432-0637-1
- The Seat of the Soul (1989). ISBN 0-671-25383-2 – number 1 New York Times best seller 31 times and staying on that list for close to 3 years
- The Dancing Wu Li Masters: An Overview of the New Physics (1979). ISBN 0-553-26382-X – winner of the American National Book Award for Science
- Una sedia per l'anima, edizioni Corbaccio, Milano, 1996

6 million copies of Zukav's books are in print and translations exist in 24 languages.

== Honors ==
- World Business Academy Pathfinder Award for Contribution to the Ongoing Evolution of Knowledge and Consciousness within the Global Business Community.
- American Journal of Psychotherapy and Albert Einstein College of Medicine Einstein Award in Recognition of Outstanding Contributions to the Psychosocial Growth of Humanity.
- St. Christopher Foundation Christopher Award for "Lighting One Candle Instead of Cursing the Darkness".
- Zukav was honored with the Award for Clear Telling of Deep Wisdom by the New York Open Center in 2001 for his book, Seat of the Soul, and for his co-founding of Genesis: The Foundation for the Universal Human.
- Named to Oprah's SuperSoul100 list of visionaries and influential leaders in 2016.
