= Fritjof Capra =

American physicist and author (born 1939)

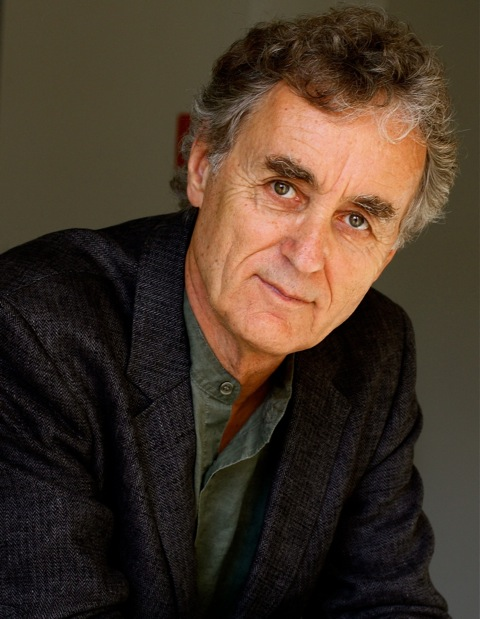
- Capra in 2010
- Born: February 1, 1939 (age 87); Vienna, Austria
- Education: University of Vienna
- Known for: Ecoliteracy; Systems thinking in ecological education
- Scientific career
- Fields: Physics, systems theory
- Workplaces: U.C. Santa Cruz, U.C. Berkeley, San Francisco State University
- Thesis: Feldtheoretisches Modell des Gravitationskollapses von Neutronensternen (1966)
- Doctoral advisor: Walter Thirring
- Writing career
- Notable works: The Tao of Physics; The Turning Point

Fritjof Capra (born February 1, 1939) is an Austrian-born American author, physicist, systems theorist and deep ecologist. In 1995, he became a founding director of the Center for Ecoliteracy in Berkeley, California. He was on the faculty of Schumacher College, which was disestablished in 2024.

Capra is the author of several books, including The Tao of Physics (1975), The Turning Point (1982), Uncommon Wisdom (1988), The Web of Life (1996), and The Hidden Connections (2002), and co-author of The Systems View of Life (2014).

== Life and work ==
Born in Vienna, Austria, Capra attended the University of Vienna, where he earned his PhD in theoretical physics in 1966. He conducted research in particle physics and systems theory at the University of Paris (1966–1968), the University of California, Santa Cruz (1968–1970), the Stanford Linear Accelerator Center (1970), Imperial College, London (1971–1974) and the Lawrence Berkeley Laboratory (1975–1988). While at Berkeley, he was a member of the Fundamental Fysiks Group, founded in May 1975 by Elizabeth Rauscher and George Weissmann, which met weekly to discuss philosophy and quantum physics. He also taught at U.C. Santa Cruz, U.C. Berkeley, and San Francisco State University.

He has written popular books on the implications of science, notably The Tao of Physics (1975), subtitled An Exploration of the Parallels Between Modern Physics and Eastern Mysticism. The Tao of Physics asserts that both physics and metaphysics lead inexorably to the same knowledge. After touring Germany in the early 1980s, Capra co-wrote Green Politics with author Charlene Spretnak in 1984.

Capra contributed to the screenplay for the 1990 movie Mindwalk, starring Liv Ullmann, Sam Waterston and John Heard. The film is loosely based on his book, The Turning Point.

In 1991 Capra co-authored Belonging to the Universe with David Steindl-Rast, a Benedictine monk. Using Thomas Kuhn's The Structure of Scientific Revolutions as a stepping stone, the book explores parallels between new paradigm thinking in science and in religion; the authors posit that, together, these new paradigms offer remarkably compatible views about the universe.

He is a founding director of the Center for Ecoliteracy located in Berkeley, California, which promotes ecology and systems thinking in primary and secondary education.

Capra is an Earth Charter International Council member.

=== Intellectual influence of Geoffrey Chew and Bootstrap Theory ===
Although Capra received his PhD under Walter Thirring, he identifies physicist Geoffrey Chew as his primary scientific mentor. During his fourteen years associated with Chew’s research group at the Lawrence Berkeley National Laboratory (1975–1988), Capra became a proponent of the S-matrix bootstrap theory.

The bootstrap model, which posits that the universe is a self-consistent "web" of interrelated events rather than a collection of fundamental building blocks, served as the scientific foundation for Capra's philosophy. Capra has stated that his discussions with Chew served as his "training in systemic thinking," allowing him to transition from particle physics to broader systems theory.

Year later, in a memoriam about Geoffrey Chew published on his own blog, Capra acknowledged that bootstrap theory was eclipsed by the success of the Standard Model and largely disappeared from mainstream physics. However, he also said that since "the standard model does not include gravity, and hence fails to integrate all known particles and forces into a single mathematical framework [...], the bootstrap idea may well be revived someday, in some mathematical formulation or other."

== Reception ==
Physicist Peter Woit criticized Capra in his 2006 book Not even wrong for continuing to adhere to the bootstrap philosophy in later editions of The Tao of Physics, even after the theory was largely superseded in the mid-1970s by the discovery of quarks and the development of the Standard Model:

The Tao of Physics was completed in December 1974 and the implications of the November Revolution one month before this that led to the dramatic confirmations of the standard model quantum field theory clearly had not sunk in for Capra (like many others at that time). What is harder to understand is that the book has now gone through several editions, and in each of them Capra has left intact the now out-of-date physics, and now included new forewords and afterwords that with a straight face deny what has happened.

== Bibliography ==
- The Tao of Physics: An Exploration of the Parallels Between Modern Physics and Eastern Mysticism (1975), Capra's first book, draws parallels between Vedic and Oriental mystical traditions and the discoveries of 20th century physics. Originally published by a small publisher with no budget for promotion, the book became a bestseller by word of mouth until it was picked up by a major American publishing house. It has now been published in 43 editions in 23 languages. It is credited as a major influence for the rise of quantum mysticism.
- The Turning Point: Science, Society, and the Rising Culture (1982) explains perceived scientific and economic crises. It begins by outlining and tracing the history of science and economics, and criticizing Cartesian, Newtonian, and reductionist paradigms. It argues that such viewpoints have grown inadequate for modern technology and ecology needs, and that science needs to develop the concepts and insights of holism and systems theory to solve society's complex problems.
- Green Politics (1984), co-authored with Charlene Spretnak, analyzes the rise of the Green Party in Germany and similar ecology-oriented political parties in other European countries. It has been published in 7 editions in 4 languages.
- Uncommon Wisdom (1988) describes dialogues and personal encounters between himself and the thinkers who helped to shape the theme of The Turning Point. It has been published in 16 editions and 12 languages.
- Belonging to the Universe: Explorations on the Frontiers of Science and Spirituality (1993) was coauthored with David Steindl-Rast and Thomas Matus. The book explores parallels between ways of thinking in science and Christian theology. It has been published in 10 editions in 7 languages.
- The Web of Life: A New Scientific Understanding of Living Systems (1996) starts from the conceptual framework presented in The Turning Point, summarizes the mathematics of complexity, and offers a synthesis of recent nonlinear theories of living systems that have dramatically increased our understanding of the key characteristics of life. Capra makes extensive reference to the work of Humberto Maturana, Francisco Varela, Ilya Prigogine, Gregory Bateson and others in proposing a new, systems-based scientific approach for describing the interrelationships and interdependence of psychological, biological, physical, social, and cultural phenomena. The book has been published in 14 editions in 10 languages.
- The Hidden Connections (2002) extends the framework of systems and complexity theory to the social domain and uses the extended framework to discuss some of the critical issues of our time.
- The Science of Leonardo: Inside the Mind of the Great Genius of the Renaissance (2007). Its central idea is that Leonardo da Vinci's science is a science of living forms, of quality, which can be seen as a distant forerunner of today's complexity and systems theories. The book has been published in 7 editions in 5 languages.
- Learning from Leonardo: Decoding the Notebooks of a Genius (2013), offers a glimpse into the works of the prescient thinker, Leonardo da Vinci, whose pioneering genius contributed to many scientific fields.
- The Systems View of Life (2014), co-authored with Pier Luigi Luisi, offers radical solutions to twenty-first century challenges by focusing on the connected world and examining life through its inextricably linked systems.
- Patterns of Connection: Essential Essays from Five Decades (2021) is a personal account of the author's intellectual journey, documented by a series of essays together with extensive commentaries that interweave the essays and provide historical and philosophical context.

== See also ==
- Arne Næss
- Center for Ecoliteracy
- Deep Ecology
- Ecoliteracy
- Ervin Laszlo
- Gaia hypothesis
- Gregory Bateson
- Hindu idealism
- Holism
- Systems theory
