= Jack Sarfatti =

American theoretical physicist (born 1939)

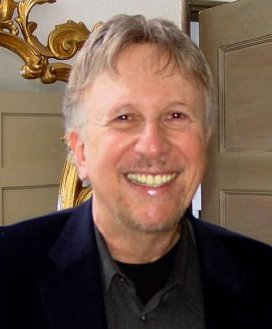
- Sarfatti in 2007
- Born: Jack Sarfatt; September 14, 1939 (age 87); New York City, US

Academic background
- Education: Cornell University; University of California, San Diego; University of California, Riverside
- Thesis: Gauge Invariance in the Theory of Superfluidity (1969)
- Doctoral advisor: Fred Cummings
- Website: stardrive.org

Jack Sarfatti (born September 14, 1939) is an American theoretical physicist. Working largely outside academia, most of Sarfatti's publications investigate quantum physics and consciousness.

Sarfatti was a leading member of the Fundamental Fysiks Group, an informal group of physicists in California in the 1970s who, according to historian of science David Kaiser, aimed to inspire some of the investigations into quantum physics that underlie parts of quantum information science. Sarfatti co-wrote Space-Time and Beyond (1975; with Bob Toben and Fred Alan Wolf) and has published several books.

== Early life and education ==
Jack Sarfatt was born in Brooklyn, New York, to Hyman and Millie Sarfatti and raised in the borough's Midwood neighborhood. His father was born in Kastoria, Greece, and moved to New York as a child with his family.

After graduating from Midwood High School in 1956, Sarfatt attended Cornell University, where he received a B.A. in physics in 1960. Following graduate studies at Cornell and Brandeis University, he obtained an M.S. in 1967 from the University of California, San Diego and a Ph.D. in 1969 from the University of California, Riverside under Fred Cummings, both in physics; his dissertation was "Gauge Invariance in the Theory of Superfluidity."

== Career ==
From 1967 to 1971, Sarfatt was an assistant professor of physics at San Diego State University. He also studied at the Cornell Space Science Center, the UK Atomic Energy Research Establishment, the Max Planck Institute for Physics, and International Centre for Theoretical Physics. Then he decided to leave academia around the time when he was in Trieste.

In the 1970s, he changed the spelling of his name from Sarfatt to Sarfatti.

Sarfatti was invited to help shape the 100 Year Starship program.

Sarfatti's ideas relating quantum physics to David Chalmers's "Hard problem of consciousness" (i.e., how our conscious experiences are generated) are mentioned in a paper by Paavo Pylkkänen.

Sarfatti claims to have been recruited in the 1970s by agents of the CIA and DOD to work on both the physics of consciousness and the propulsion of "flying saucers." MIT professor David Kaiser mentions these connections in his book How the Hippies Saved Physics. As proof, Sarfatti cites a recording of his 1973 meeting with Harold E. Puthoff, Russell Targ, and others during his visit to Stanford Research Institute.

Sarfatti's name appears in several released CIA documents, including a summary for the STARGATE project for remote viewing published June 1, 1979.

=== Politics ===
According to Kaiser, Sarfatti's politics have leaned to the right since the early 1980s, when he became dependent on a cadre of "politically conservative thinkers who were drawn to certain New Age ideas" for research funding, following the dissolution of his relationship with Werner Erhard.

== Other activities ==
A longtime habitué of Caffe Trieste, Sarfatti has been involved in the Fundamental Fysiks Group, the Esalen Institute-affiliated Physics–Consciousness Research Group, and the 100 Year Starship project.

== Selected works ==
- Toben, Bob (1975). Space-Time and Beyond: Toward an Explanation of the Unexplainable. E.P. Dutton (Toben in conversation with Fred Alan Wolf and Jack Sarfatti). ISBN 978-0-525-47399-2
- Sarfatti, J.; Stoneham, A.M. (1966). "The Goldstone Theorem and the Jahn-Teller Effect" (PDF). Proceedings of the Physical Society. 91 (1): 214–221. doi:10.1088/0370-1328/91/1/331.
- Sarfatti, Jack (2020). "Henry Stapp's Influence on My Post-Quantum Mechanics of Consciousness Via Locally Decodable Keyless Entanglement Signaling". Activitas Nervosa Superior. 62: 25–28. doi:10.1007/s41470-019-00060-1. S2CID 191144774.

== Sources ==
- Kaiser, David (2011). How the Hippies Saved Physics: Science, Counterculture, and the Quantum Revival. W. W. Norton. ISBN 9780393076363. OCLC 758540688.
