= Physics Today =

Monthly scientific magazine

- Cover of October 2016 issue
- Editor: Richard Fitzgerald
- Categories: Physics
- Frequency: Monthly
- Publisher: American Institute of Physics
- Total circulation: 134,146 (December 2012)
- First issue: 1948
- Country: United States
- Based in: College Park, Maryland
- Website: www.physicstoday.org
- ISSN: 0031-9228
- OCLC: 643170318

Physics Today is the membership magazine of the American Institute of Physics. First published in May 1948, it is issued on a monthly schedule, and is provided to the members of ten physics societies, including the American Physical Society. It is also available to non-members as a paid annual subscription.

The magazine informs readers about important developments in overview articles written by experts, shorter review articles written internally by staff, and also discusses issues and events of importance to the science community in politics, education, and other fields. The magazine provides a historical resource of events associated with physics. For example it discussed physics and feasibility of the Star Wars program of the 1980s, and the state of physics in China and the Soviet Union during the 1950s and 1970s.

According to the Journal Citation Reports, the journal has a 2017 impact factor of 4.370.
