= David Kaiser (physicist) =

American physicist and historian of science

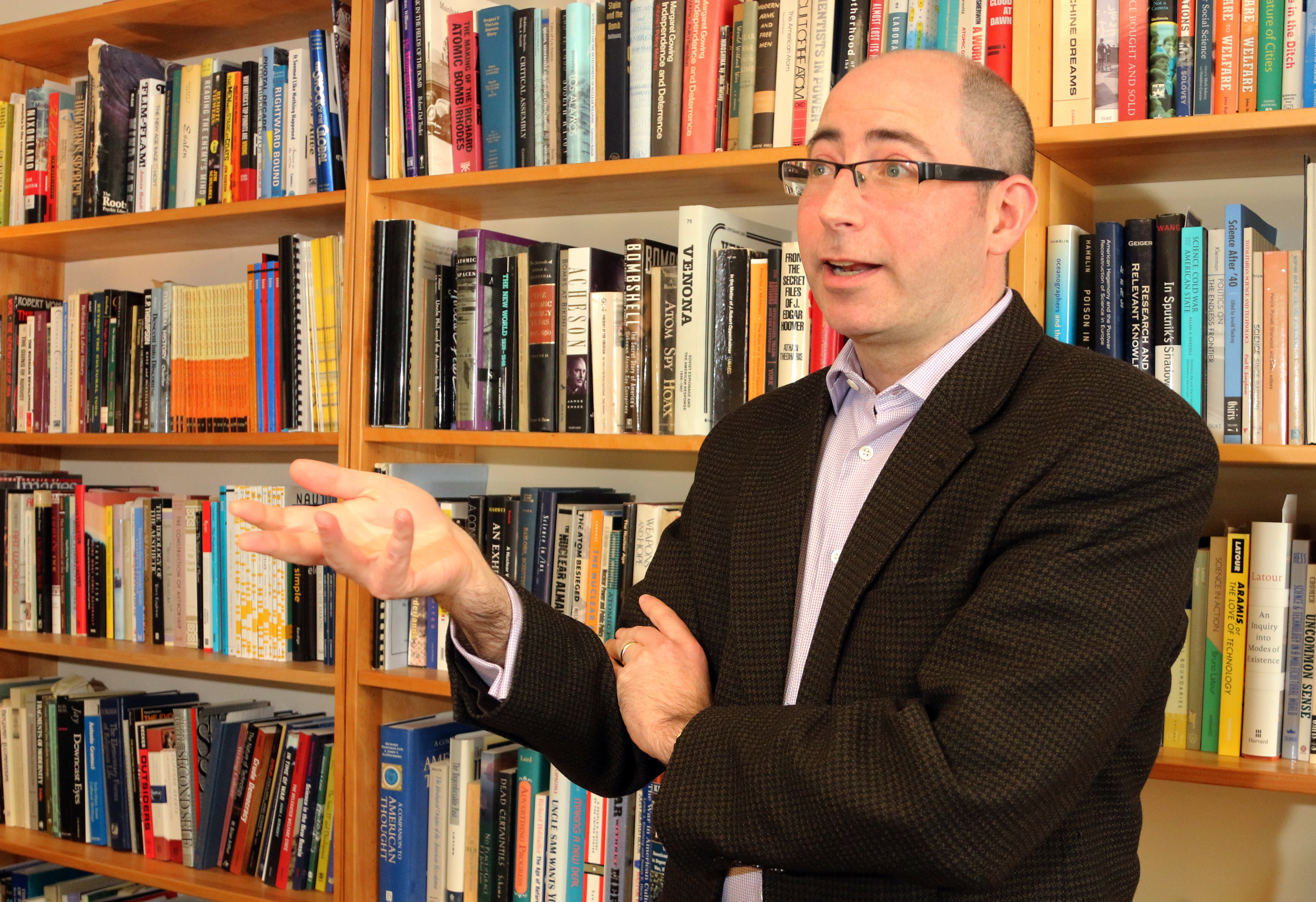
- Citizenship: American
- Education: Dartmouth College (A.B. 1993); Harvard University (Ph.D 1997, 2000)
- Scientific career
- Fields: Physics; History of science
- Workplaces: Massachusetts Institute of Technology
- Website: http://web.mit.edu/dikaiser/www/

David I. Kaiser is an American physicist and historian of science. He is Germeshausen Professor of the History of Science at the Massachusetts Institute of Technology (MIT) and a full professor in MIT's department of physics. He also served as an inaugural associate dean for MIT's cross-disciplinary program in Social and Ethical Responsibilities of Computing.

Kaiser is the author or editor of several books on the history of science, including Drawing Theories Apart (2005), How the Hippies Saved Physics (2011), and Quantum Legacies (2020). He received the Apker Award from the American Physical Society in 1993 and was elected a Fellow of the American Physical Society in 2010. His historical scholarship has been honored with the Pfizer Award (2007) and the Davis Prize (2013) from the History of Science Society. In March 2012 he was awarded the MacVicar fellowship, a prestigious MIT undergraduate teaching award. In 2012, he also received the Frank E. Perkins Award from MIT for excellence in mentoring graduate students.

== Education ==
Kaiser received his bachelor's degree in physics at Dartmouth College in 1993. He then earned two PhDs from Harvard University. The first was in physics in 1997 for a thesis on cosmology and the second in the history of science in 2000 for a dissertation on physics education and research in the United States after World War II.

== Research on physics ==
=== Cosmic inflation ===
Kaiser's physics research mostly focuses on primordial cosmology, including topics such as cosmic inflation, post-inflation reheating, and primordial black holes. In particular, he and colleagues have studied a wide range of initial conditions under which inflation will begin, as well as constructing models of inflation that include features motivated by high-energy particle physics, such as multiple interacting fields with nonminimal couplings to spacetime curvature.

This work includes some of the first calculations of predictions from such models for observable features such as the spectral index of primordial perturbations measured in the cosmic microwave background radiation, the first demonstration that resonant particle production during the reheating phase can persist amid an expanding universe, and the first demonstration of attractor behaviors in multifield models. More recent work has identified distinct processes within the late stages of the reheating phase, which ultimately yield the conditions for standard Big Bang evolution: a hot plasma of Standard Model particles in thermal equilibrium.

=== Primordial black holes ===
Some of Kaiser's research focuses on primordial black holes, especially as a viable candidate for dark matter. Unlike various hypothetical particles, such as weakly interacting massive particles (WIMPs) or ultralight particles such as axions, primordial black holes would not require any new particles beyond the Standard Model in order to account for the measured dark matter abundance. Kaiser also explores the possibility of identifying primordial black holes by detecting exceptionally high-energy neutrinos, emitted as part of these objects' Hawking radiation.

Kaiser and his colleagues have studied mechanisms by which a population of primordial black holes could have formed during the very early universe in models that preserve the close fit between predictions and observations of the cosmic microwave background radiation. They have also identified a possible subpopulation of primordial black holes that would have formed with significant QCD color charge, constituting a novel state of matter. Additionally, they have proposed a new observable test to help establish whether primordial black holes exist and contribute significantly to dark matter abundance, based on high-precision measurements of visible objects within the Solar System, such as the planet Mars.

=== Experimental tests of quantum theory ===
Kaiser has also helped to design and conduct novel experimental tests of quantum mechanics. In one such test, Kaiser and colleagues demonstrated how measurements of neutrino oscillations could be used to test whether quantum objects really persist in superposition states—akin to Schrödinger's cat—between preparation and measurement. By applying the neutrino measurements to the Leggett-Garg inequality, their long-baseline test showed clear evidence of quantum superpositions over a distance of 450 miles (720 km).

In a separate project, Kaiser and colleagues first proposed a novel protocol for experimental tests of Bell's inequality to address the so-called "freedom-of-choice" loophole. Working with Nobel laureate Anton Zeilinger and his group, their "Cosmic Bell" experiments demonstrated quantum entanglement while using real-time astronomical measurements of cosmologically distant events to determine the types of measurements performed on each member of an entangled pair. These experiments placed the tightest constraints yet on certain types of alternative models to quantum theory, excluding nearly all possible exploitation of the freedom-of-choice loophole from the causal past of the experiments, extending from the Big Bang to today. The Cosmic Bell experiments were featured in the PBS NOVA documentary film Einstein's Quantum Riddle (2019).

== Research on the history of physics ==
Kaiser's historical research focuses on intersections among modern natural sciences, geopolitics, and the history of higher education during the Cold War. His major historical publications include:

- Drawing Theories Apart: The Dispersion of Feynman Diagrams in Postwar Physics (2005) – A study of how the American physicist Richard Feynman's idiosyncratic approach to high-energy physics entered the mainstream. Recipient of the Pfizer Award from the History of Science Society. Historian of science Melinda Baldwin called it an "essential" book on the history of physics. Physicist Eugen Merzbacher praised it as "colorful and readable account" of the early history of Feynman diagrams that included first-hand accounts from the people who developed quantum electrodynamics after World War II.
- How the Hippies Saved Physics: Science, Counterculture, and the Quantum Revival (2011) – An exploration of how countercultural figures became some of the earliest physicists to focus on Bell's theorem and quantum entanglement during the 1960s and 1970s. This book received the Davis Prize from the History of Science Society and was named "Book of the Year" by Physics World magazine in 2012.
- Quantum Legacies: Dispatches from an Uncertain World (2020) – An anthology of essays on the history and sociology of the development of quantum mechanics, covering funding for research as well as trends in research, teaching, and publishing. These essays may be read in arbitrary order, and may be perused by both physicists and laypersons alike. It features many statistics and metaphors.

His MIT course on "Einstein, Oppenheimer, Feynman: Physics in the Twentieth Century" is available via MIT OpenCourseWare. In addition to his scholarly writing, Kaiser's work has appeared in The New York Times, The New Yorker magazine, and in several PBS Nova television programs. He also serves as chair of the editorial board of MIT Press and as editor of MIT Case Studies Series on Social and Ethical Responsibilities of Computing. As an invited advisor to a U.S. National Academy of Sciences panel during 2023-24, Kaiser helped to draft a consensus statement regarding generative artificial intelligence and scientific integrity, as well as providing historical context for societal reactions to previous once-new technologies.

== Awards and honors ==
- LeRoy Apker Award, American Physical Society (1993)
- Pfizer Prize, History of Science Society (2007)
- Fellow, American Physical Society (2010)
- Davis Prize, History of Science Society (2013)

== Books ==
- (2005). Drawing Theories Apart: The Dispersion of Feynman Diagrams in Postwar Physics. University of Chicago Press.
- (2005). (ed.) Pedagogy and the Practice of Science: Historical and Contemporary Perspectives. MIT Press.
- (2010). (ed.) Becoming MIT: Moments of Decision. MIT Press.
- (2011). How the Hippies Saved Physics: Science, Counterculture, and the Quantum Revival. W. W. Norton, ISBN 0393076369.
- with Sally Gregory Kohlstedt: (2013). (eds.) Science and the American Century. University of Chicago Press.
- with W. Patrick McCray: (2016). (eds.) Groovy Science: Knowledge, Innovation, and American Counterculture. University of Chicago Press.
- (2020). Quantum Legacies: Dispatches from an Uncertain World. University of Chicago Press.
- with Aaron S. Wright and Diana Coleman: (2022). (eds.) Theoretical Physics in Your Face: Selected Correspondence of Sidney Coleman. World Scientific.
- (2022). (ed.) 'Well, Doc, You're In': Freeman Dyson's Journey through the Universe. MIT Press.
